= Apollo 15 =

Fourth crewed Moon landing

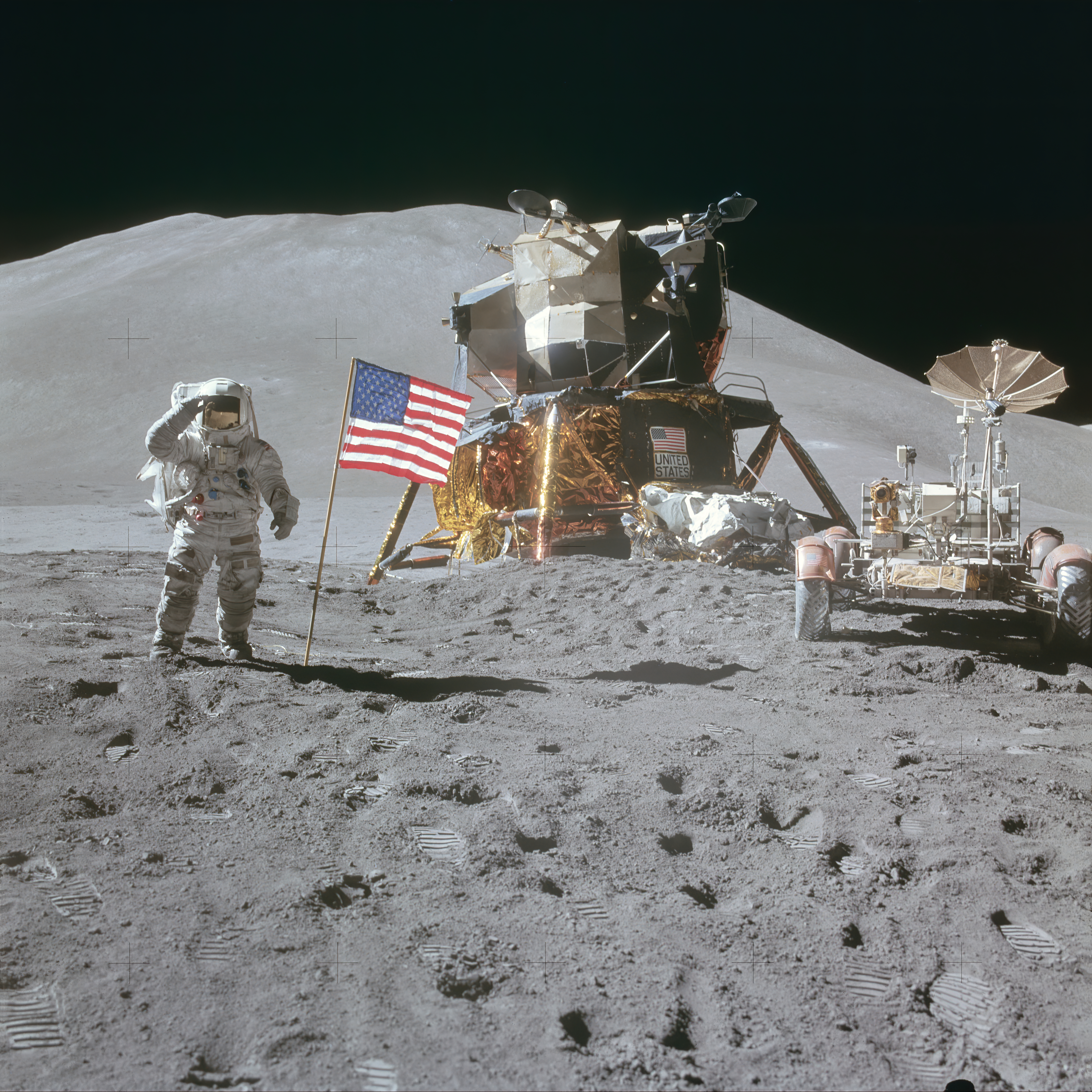
- James Irwin salutes the United States flag on the Moon, August 2, 1971
- Mission type: Crewed lunar landing (J)
- Operator: NASA
- COSPAR ID: CSM: 1971-063A; LM: 1971-063C
- SATCAT no.: CSM: 5351; LM: 5366
- Mission duration: 12 days, 7 hours, 11 minutes, 53 seconds

Spacecraft properties
- Spacecraft: Apollo CSM-112; Apollo LM-10
- Manufacturer: CSM: North American Rockwell; LM: Grumman
- Launch mass: 48,599 kg (107,142 lb)
- Landing mass: 5,321 kg (11,731 lb)

Crew
- Crew size: 3
- Members: David R. Scott; Alfred M. Worden; James B. Irwin
- Callsign: CSM: Endeavour; LM: Falcon
- EVAs: 1 in cislunar space and 4 on the lunar surface
- EVA duration: 39 minutes, 7 seconds Spacewalk to retrieve film cassettes

Start of mission
- Launch date: July 26, 1971, 13:34:00 UTC
- Rocket: Saturn V SA-510
- Launch site: Kennedy, LC-39A

End of mission
- Recovered by: USS Okinawa
- Landing date: August 7, 1971, 20:45:53 UTC
- Landing site: North Pacific Ocean; 26°7′N 158°8′W

Orbital parameters
- Reference system: Selenocentric
- Periselene altitude: 101.5 km (54.8 nmi; 63.1 mi)
- Aposelene altitude: 120.8 km (65.2 nmi; 75.0 mi)
- Inclination: 23°
- Epoch: July 30, 1971

Lunar orbiter
- Spacecraft component: Command and service module
- Orbital insertion: July 29, 1971, 20:05:46 UTC
- Orbital departure: August 4, 1971, 21:22:45 UTC
- Orbits: 74

Lunar lander
- Spacecraft component: Lunar Module
- Landing date: July 30, 1971, 22:16:29 UTC
- Return launch: August 2, 1971, 17:11:23 UTC
- Landing site: Hadley–Apennine; 26.1322°N 3.6339°E
- Sample mass: 77 kg (170 lb)
- Surface EVAs: 4 (including standup)
- EVA duration: 19 hours, 7 minutes, 53 seconds; Standup: 33 minutes, 7 seconds; First: 6 hours, 32 minutes, 42 seconds; Second: 7 hours, 12 minutes, 14 seconds; Third: 4 hours, 49 minutes, 50 seconds

Lunar rover
- Distance driven: 27.9 km (15.1 nmi; 17.3 mi)

Docking with Lunar Module
- Docking date: July 26, 1971, 17:07:49 UTC
- Undocking date: July 30, 1971, 18:13:16 UTC

Docking with Lunar Module Ascent Stage
- Docking date: August 2, 1971, 19:10:25 UTC
- Undocking date: August 3, 1971, 01:04:01 UTC

Payload
- Particles and Fields Subsatellite (PFS-1); Lunar Roving Vehicle
- Mass: PFS-1: 35.6 kg (78.5 lb); LRV: 210 kg (463 lb)
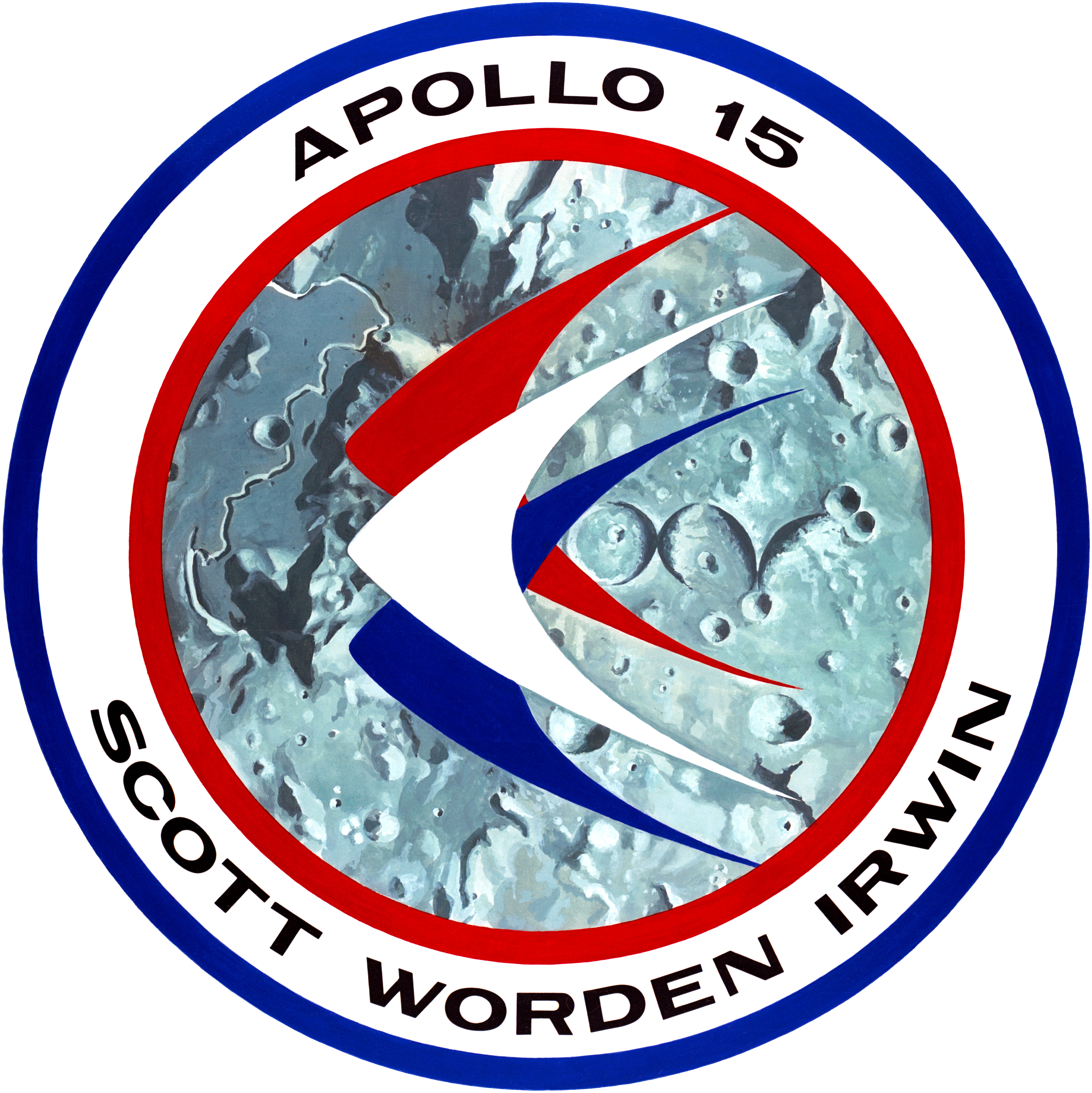
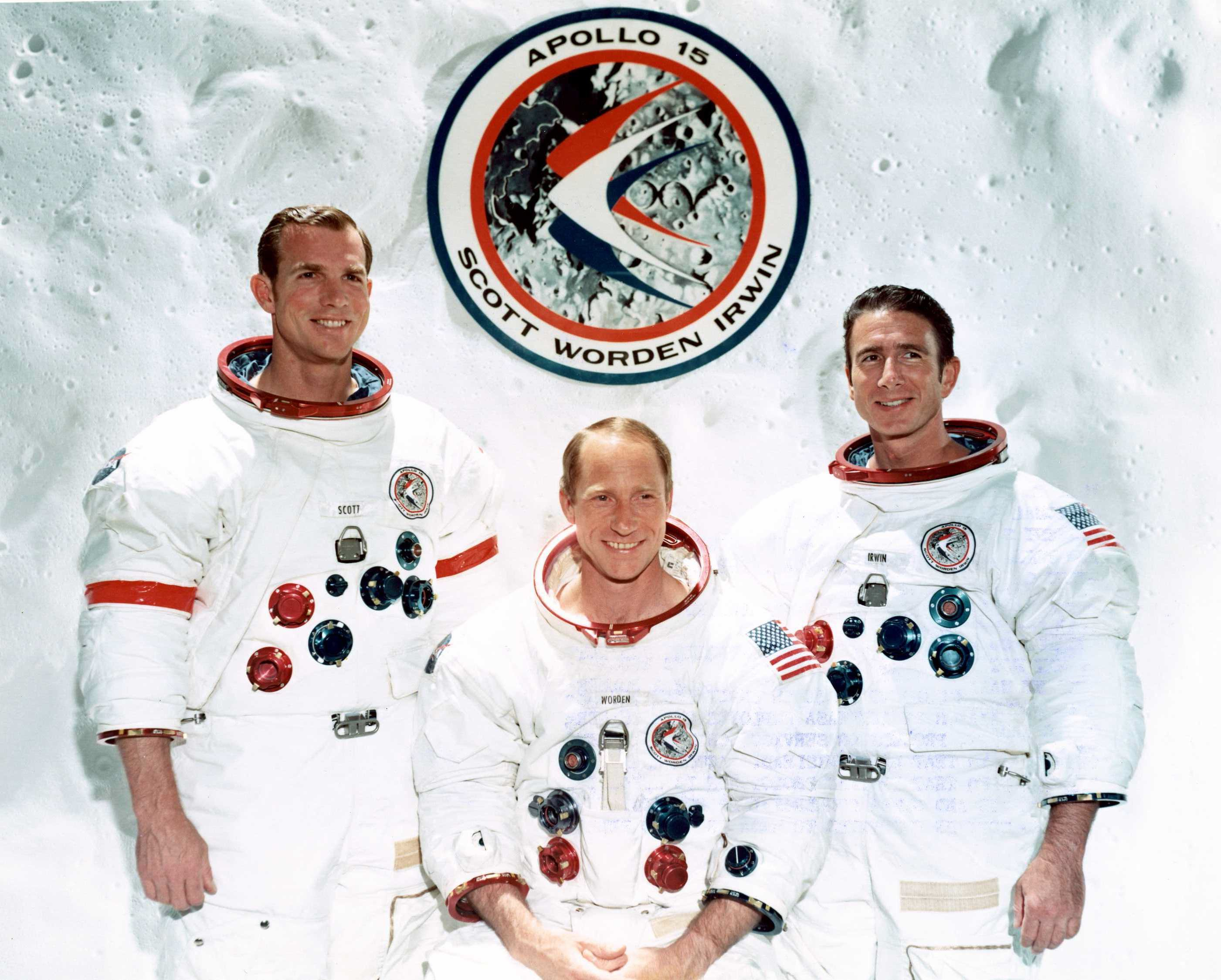
- Left to right: Scott, Worden, Irwin Apollo program

Apollo 15 (July 26 – August 7, 1971) was the ninth crewed mission in the Apollo program and the fourth Moon landing. It was the first J mission, with a longer stay on the Moon and a greater focus on science than earlier landings. Apollo 15 saw the first use of the Lunar Roving Vehicle.

The mission began on July 26 and ended on August 7, with the lunar surface exploration taking place between July 30 and August 2. Commander David Scott and Lunar Module Pilot James Irwin landed near Hadley Rille and explored the local area using the rover, allowing them to travel further from the Lunar Module than had been possible on previous missions. They spent 18 1/2 hours on the Moon's surface on four extravehicular activities (EVA), and collected 170 pounds (77 kg) of surface material.

At the same time, Command Module Pilot Alfred Worden orbited the Moon, operating the sensors in the scientific instrument module (SIM) bay of the service module. This suite of instruments collected data on the Moon and its environment using a panoramic camera, a gamma-ray spectrometer, a mapping camera, a laser altimeter, a mass spectrometer, and a lunar subsatellite deployed at the end of the moonwalks. The Lunar Module returned safely to the command module and, at the end of Apollo 15's 74th lunar orbit, the engine was fired for the journey home. During the return trip, Worden performed the first spacewalk in cis-lunar space. The Apollo 15 mission splashed down safely on August 7 despite the partial opening of one of its three parachutes.

The mission accomplished its goals and also saw the collection of the Genesis Rock, thought to be part of the Moon's early crust, and Scott's use of a hammer and a feather to validate Galileo's theory that when there is no air resistance, objects fall at the same rate due to gravity regardless of their mass. The mission received negative publicity the following year when it emerged that the crew had carried unauthorized postal covers to the lunar surface, some of which were sold by a West German stamp dealer. The members of the crew were reprimanded for poor judgment, and did not fly in space again.

== Background ==
In 1962, NASA contracted for the construction of fifteen Saturn V rockets to achieve the Apollo program's goal of a crewed landing on the Moon by 1970; at the time no one knew how many missions this would require. In 1969 Apollo 11 succeeded in landing on the Moon with the sixth Saturn V, so nine rockets remained available for a hoped-for total of ten landings. These plans included a heavier, extended version of the Apollo spacecraft to be used in the last five missions (Apollo 16 through 20). The revamped Lunar Module would be capable of up to a 75-hour stay, and would carry a Lunar Roving Vehicle to the Moon's surface. The service module would house a package of orbital experiments to gather data on the Moon. In the original plan Apollo 15 was to be the last of the non-extended missions to land in Censorinus crater. But in anticipation of budget cuts, NASA cancelled three landing missions by September 1970. Apollo 15 became the first of three extended missions, known as J missions, and the landing site was moved to Hadley Rille, originally planned for Apollo 19.

== Crew and key Mission Control personnel ==
=== Crew ===
| Position | Astronaut |
|---|---|
| Commander | David Scott; Third and last spaceflight |
| Command module pilot (CMP) | Alfred Worden; Only spaceflight |
| Lunar module pilot (LMP) | James Irwin; Only spaceflight |

Scott was born in 1932 in San Antonio, Texas, and, after spending his freshman year at the University of Michigan on a swimming scholarship, transferred to the United States Military Academy, from which he graduated in 1954. Serving in the Air Force, Scott had received two advanced degrees from MIT in 1962 before being selected as one of the third group of astronauts the following year. He flew in Gemini 8 in 1966 alongside Neil Armstrong and as command module pilot of Apollo 9 in 1969. Worden was born in 1932 in Jackson, Michigan, and like his commander, had attended West Point (class of 1955) and served in the Air Force. Worden earned two master's degrees in engineering from Michigan in 1963. Irwin had been born in 1930 in Pittsburgh, and had attended the United States Naval Academy, graduating in 1951 and serving in the Air Force, receiving a master's degree from Michigan in 1957. Both Worden and Irwin were selected in the fifth group of astronauts (1966), and Apollo 15 would be their only spaceflight. All three future astronauts had attended Michigan, and two had taken degrees from there; it had been the first university to offer an aeronautical engineering program.

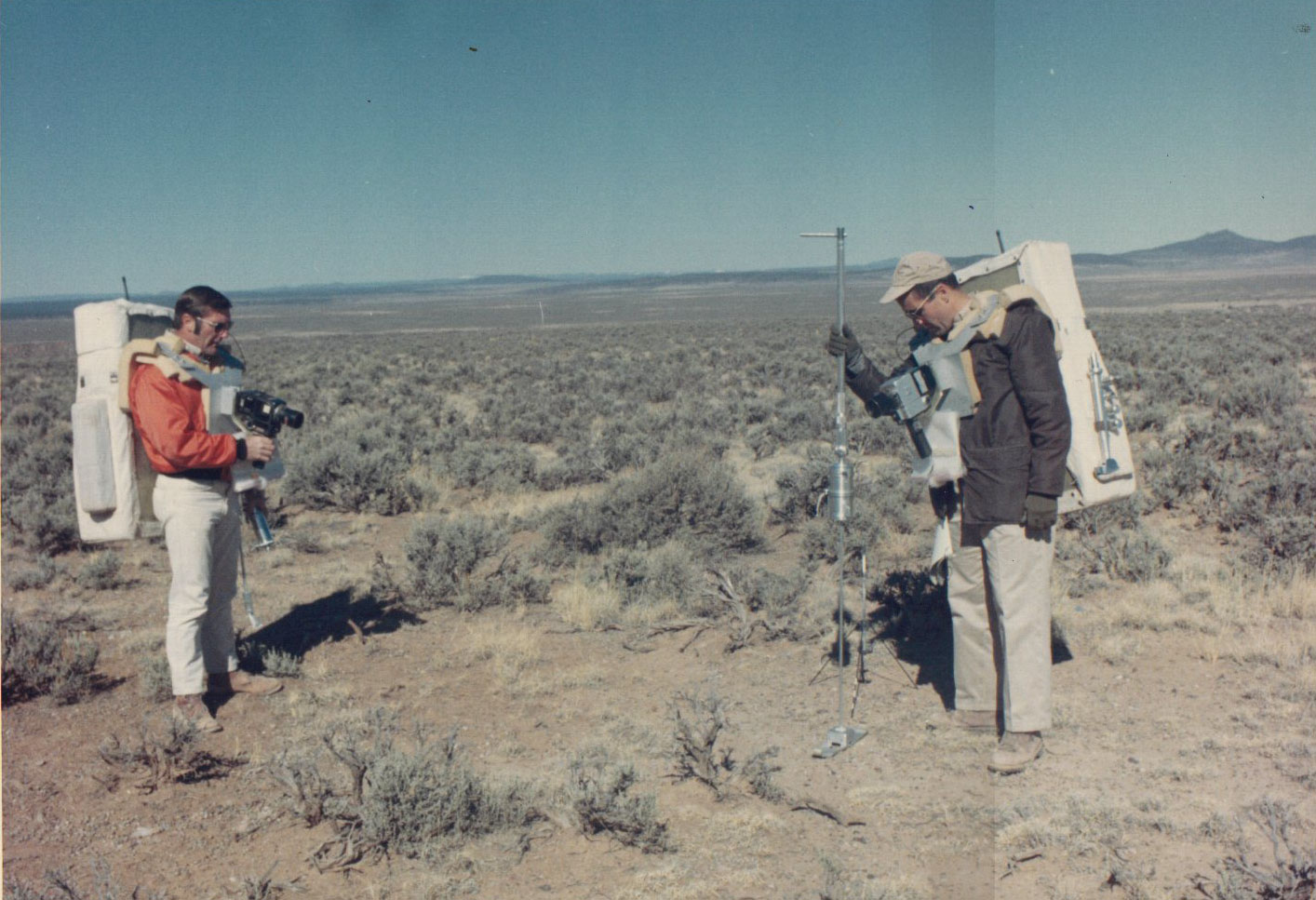
Gordon (right) and Schmitt during geology training

The backup crew was Richard F. Gordon Jr. as commander, Vance D. Brand as command module pilot and Harrison H. Schmitt as Lunar Module pilot. By the usual rotation of crews, the three would most likely have flown Apollo 18, which was canceled. Brand flew later on the Apollo–Soyuz Test Project and on STS-5, the first operational Space Shuttle mission. With NASA under intense pressure to send a professional scientist to the Moon, Schmitt, a geologist, was selected as LMP of Apollo 17 instead of Joe Engle. Apollo 15's support crew consisted of astronauts Joseph P. Allen, Robert A. Parker and Karl G. Henize. All three were scientist-astronauts, selected in 1967, as the prime crew felt they needed more assistance with the science than with the piloting. None of the support crew would fly during the Apollo program, waiting until the Space Shuttle program to go into space.

=== Mission Control ===
The flight directors for Apollo 15 were as follows:

- Gerry Griffin, Gold team
- Milton Windler, Maroon team
- Glynn Lunney, Black team
- Gene Kranz, White team

During a mission the capsule communicators (CAPCOMs), always fellow astronauts, were the only people who normally would speak to the crew. For Apollo 15, the CAPCOMs were Allen, Brand, C. Gordon Fullerton, Gordon, Henize, Edgar D. Mitchell, Parker, Schmitt and Alan B. Shepard.

== Planning and training ==
Schmitt and other scientist-astronauts advocated for a greater place for science on the early Apollo missions. They were often met with disinterest from other astronauts, or found science displaced by higher priorities. Schmitt realized that what was needed was an expert teacher who could fire the astronauts' enthusiasm, and contacted Caltech geologist Lee Silver, whom Schmitt introduced to Apollo 13's commander, Jim Lovell, and to its Lunar Module pilot, Fred Haise, then in training for their mission. Lovell and Haise were willing to go on a field expedition with Silver, and geology became a significant part of their training. Geologist Farouk El-Baz trained the prime crew's command module pilot, Ken Mattingly, to inform his planned observations from lunar orbit. The crew's newly acquired skills mostly went unused, due to the explosion that damaged the Apollo 13 spacecraft, and caused an abort of the mission. (Note: Mattingly was replaced before launch by Jack Swigert.) Apollo 14's CMP, Stuart Roosa, was enthusiastic about geology, but the mission commander, Shepard, less so.

Scott and Irwin train to use the rover

Already familiar with the spacecraft as the backup crew for Apollo 12, Scott, Worden and Irwin could devote more of their training time as prime crew for Apollo 15 to geology and sampling techniques. Scott was determined that his crew bring back the maximum amount of scientific data possible, and met with Silver in April 1970 to begin planning the geological training. Schmitt's assignment as Apollo 15's backup LMP made him an insider, and allowed him to spark competition between the prime and backup crews. The cancellation of two Apollo missions in September 1970 transformed Apollo 15 into a J mission, with a longer stay on the lunar surface, and the first Lunar Roving Vehicle (LRV). This change was welcomed by Scott, who according to David West Reynolds in his account of the Apollo program, was "something more than a hotshot pilot. Scott had the spirit of a true explorer", one determined to get the most from the J mission. The additional need for communications, including from planned experiments and the rover, required the near-rebuilding of the Honeysuckle Creek Tracking Station in Australia.

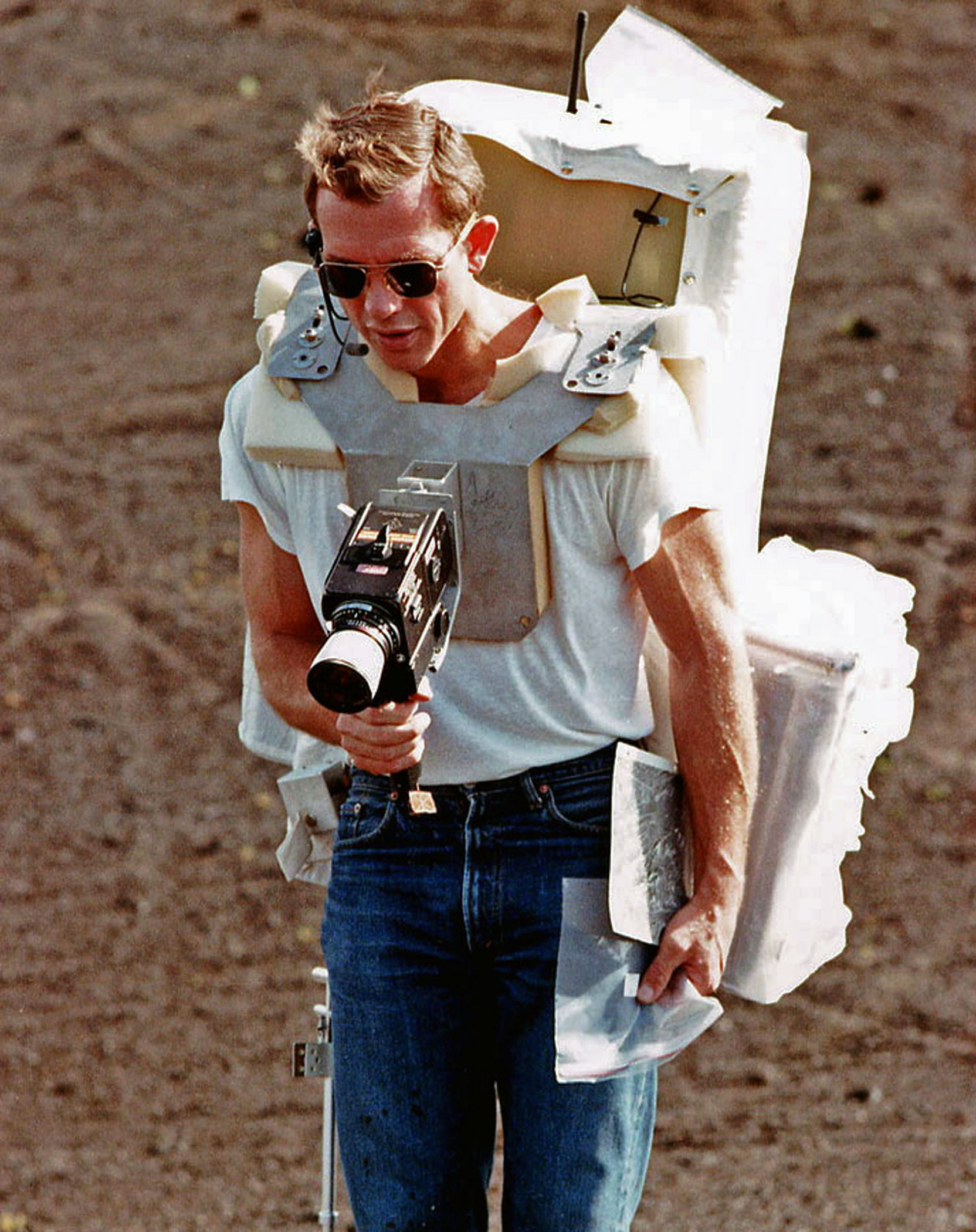
Commander David Scott takes a photograph during geology training in Hawaii, December 1970

Geology field trips took place about once a month throughout the crew's 20 months of training. At first, Silver would take the commanders and LMPs from the prime and backup crews to geological sites in Arizona and New Mexico as if for a normal field geology lesson, but closer to launch, these trips became more realistic. Crews began to wear mock-ups of the backpacks they would carry while hiking near the Rio Grande Gorge, and communicate using walkie-talkies to a CAPCOM in a tent. The CAPCOM was accompanied by a geologist unfamiliar with the area who would rely on the astronauts' descriptions to interpret the findings, and familiarized the crew members with describing landscapes to people who could not see them. Considering himself a serious amateur, Scott came to enjoy field geology.

The decision to land at Hadley came in September 1970. The Site Selection Committee had narrowed the field down to two sites—Hadley Rille, a deep channel on the edge of Mare Imbrium close to the Apennine mountains or the crater Marius, near which were a group of low, possibly volcanic, domes. Although not ultimately his decision, the commander of a mission always held great sway. To David Scott the choice was clear, as Hadley "had more variety. There is a certain intangible quality which drives the spirit of exploration and I felt that Hadley had it. Besides it looked beautiful and usually when things look good they are good." The selection of Hadley was made although NASA lacked high resolution images of the landing site; none had been made as the site was considered too rough to risk one of the earlier Apollo missions. The proximity of the Apennine mountains to the Hadley site required a landing approach trajectory of 26 degrees, far steeper than the 15 degrees in earlier Apollo landings.

The expanded mission meant that Worden spent much of his time at North American Rockwell's facilities at Downey, California, where the command and service module (CSM) was being built. He undertook a different kind of geology training. Working with El-Baz, he studied maps and photographs of the craters he would pass over while orbiting alone in the CSM. As El-Baz listened and gave feedback, Worden learned how to describe lunar features in a way that would be useful to the scientists who would listen to his transmissions back on Earth. Worden found El-Baz to be an enjoyable and inspiring teacher. Worden usually accompanied his crewmates on their geology field trips, though he was often in an airplane overhead, describing features of the landscape as the plane simulated the speed at which the lunar landscape would pass below the CSM.

The demands of the training strained both Worden's and Irwin's marriages; each sought Scott's advice, fearing a divorce might endanger their places on the mission as not projecting the image NASA wanted for the astronauts. Scott consulted Director of Flight Crew Operations Deke Slayton, their boss, who stated what was important was that the astronauts do their jobs. Although the Irwins overcame their marital difficulties, the Wordens divorced before the mission.

== Hardware ==
=== Spacecraft ===
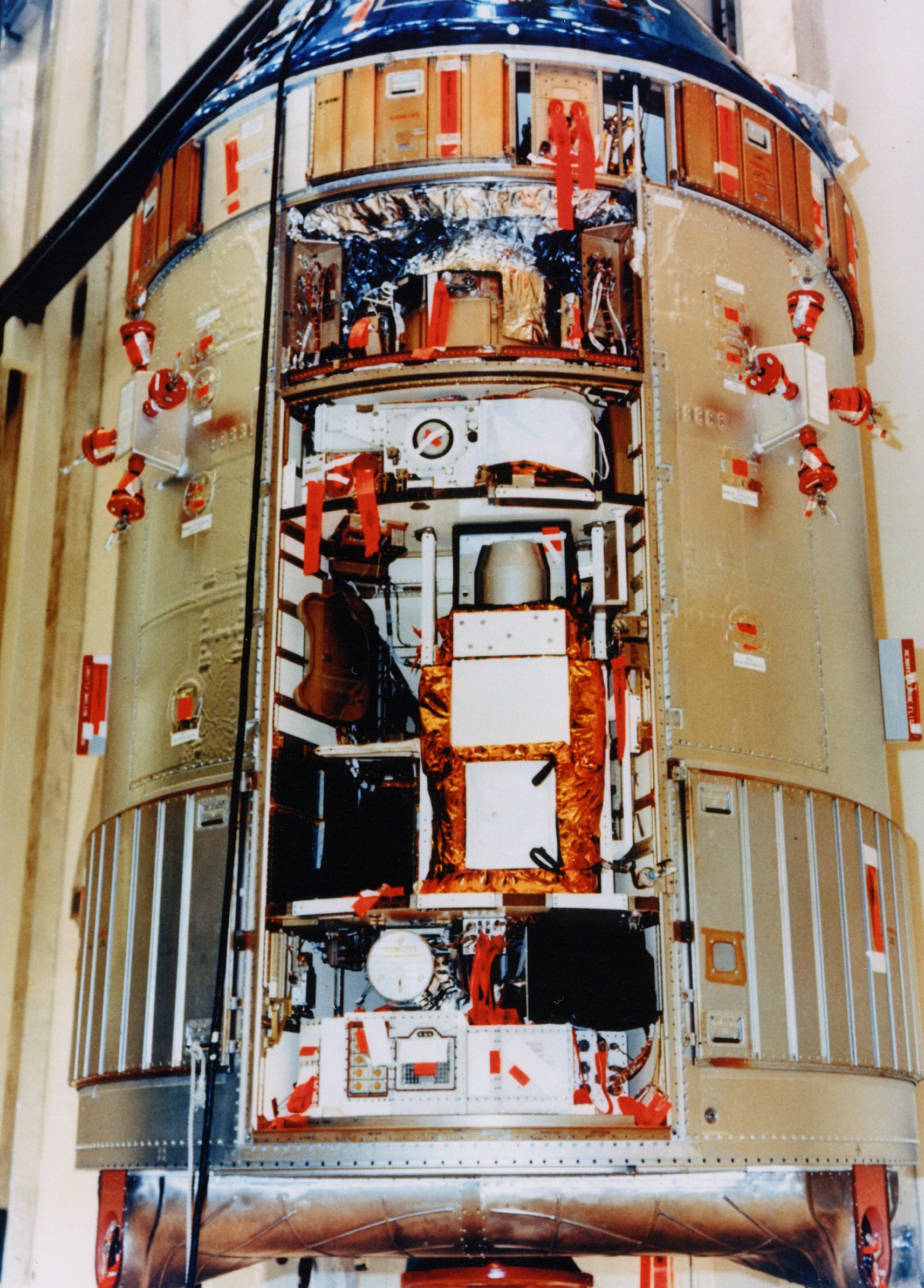
Apollo 15 SM SIM bay

Apollo 15 used command and service module CSM-112, which was given the call sign Endeavour, named after HMS Endeavour, and Lunar Module LM-10, call sign Falcon, named after the United States Air Force Academy mascot. Scott explained the choice of the name Endeavour on the grounds that its captain, James Cook, had commanded the first purely scientific sea voyage, and Apollo 15 was the first lunar landing mission on which there was a heavy emphasis on science. Apollo 15 took with it a small piece of wood from Cook's ship, while Falcon carried two falcon feathers to the Moon in recognition of the crew's service in the Air Force. Also part of the spacecraft were a Launch Escape System and a Spacecraft-Lunar Module Adapter, numbered SLA-19.

Technicians at the Kennedy Space Center had some problems with the instruments in the service module's scientific instrument module (SIM) bay. Some instruments were late in arriving, and principal investigators or representatives of NASA contractors sought further testing or to make small changes. Mechanical problems came from the fact the instruments were designed to operate in space, but had to be tested on the surface of the Earth. As such, things like the 7.5 m (24 ft) booms for the mass and gamma ray spectrometers could be tested only using equipment that tried to mimic the space environment, and, in space, the mass spectrometer boom several times did not fully retract.

On the Lunar Module, the fuel and oxidizer tanks were enlarged on both the descent and ascent stages, and the engine bell on the descent stage was extended. Batteries and solar cells were added for increased electrical power. In all this increased the weight of the Lunar Module to 36,000 pounds (16,000 kilograms), 4,000 pounds (1,800 kg) heavier than previous models.

If Apollo 15 had flown as an H mission, it would have been with CSM-111 and LM-9. That CSM was used by the Apollo–Soyuz Test Project in 1975, but the lunar module went unused and is now at the Kennedy Space Center Visitor Complex. Endeavour is on display at the National Museum of the United States Air Force at Wright-Patterson Air Force Base in Dayton, Ohio, following its transfer of ownership from NASA to the Smithsonian in December 1974.

=== Launch vehicle ===
The Saturn V that launched Apollo 15 was designated SA-510, the tenth flight-ready model of the rocket. As the payload of the rocket was greater, changes were made to the rocket and to its launch trajectory. It was launched in a more southerly direction (80–100 degrees azimuth) than previous missions, and the Earth parking orbit was lowered to 166 kilometers (90 nautical miles). These two changes meant 1,100 pounds (500 kg) more could be launched. The propellant reserves were reduced and the number of retrorockets on the S-IC first stage (used to separate the spent first stage from the S-II second stage) reduced from eight to four. The four outboard engines of the S-IC would be burned longer and the center engine would also burn longer. Changes were also made to the S-II to dampen pogo oscillations.

Once all major systems were installed in the Saturn V, it was moved from the Vehicle Assembly Building to the launch site, Launch Complex 39A. During late June and early July 1971, the rocket and Launch Umbilical Tower (LUT) were struck by lightning at least four times. There was no damage to the vehicle, and only minor damage to ground support equipment.

=== Space suits ===
The Apollo 15 astronauts wore redesigned space suits. On all previous Apollo flights, including the non-lunar flights, the commander and lunar module pilot had worn suits with the life support, liquid cooling, and communications connections in two parallel rows of three. On Apollo 15, the new suits, dubbed the "A7LB", had the connectors situated in triangular pairs. This new arrangement, along with the relocation of the entry zipper (which went in an up-down motion on the old suits), to run diagonally from the right shoulder to the left hip, aided in suiting and unsuiting in the cramped confines of the spacecraft. It also allowed for a new waist joint, letting the astronauts bend completely over, and sit on the rover. Upgraded backpacks allowed for longer-duration moonwalks. As in all missions from and after Apollo 13, the commander's suit bore a red stripe on the helmet, arms and legs.

Worden wore a suit similar to those worn by the Apollo 14 astronauts, but modified to interface with Apollo 15's equipment. Gear needed only for lunar surface EVAs, such as the liquid cooling garment, was not included with Worden's suit, as the only EVA he was expected to do was one to retrieve film cartridges from the SIM bay on the flight home.

=== Lunar Roving Vehicle ===
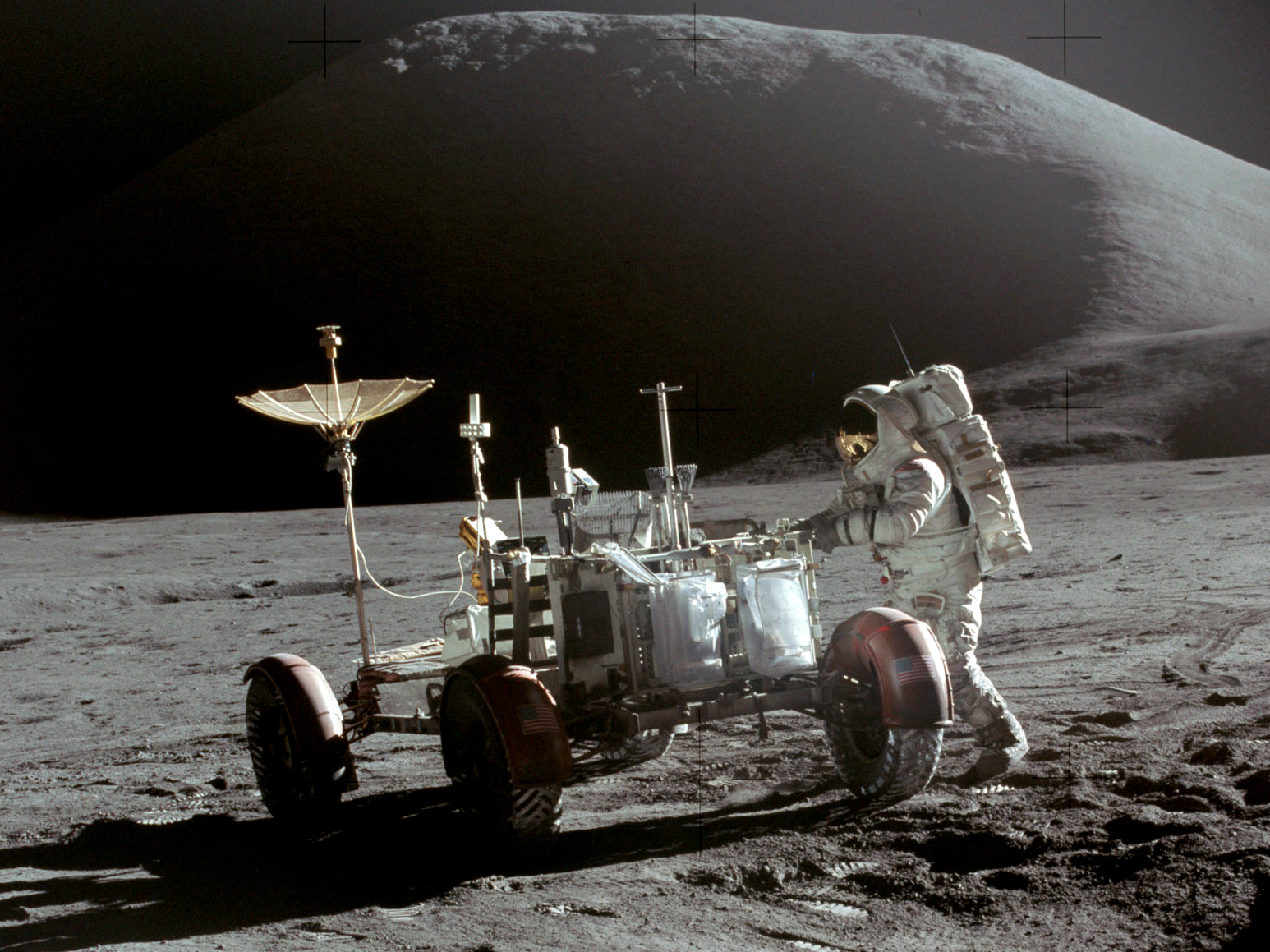
Irwin with the Lunar Roving Vehicle on the Moon. Mons Hadley is in the background.

A vehicle that could operate on the surface of the Moon had been considered by NASA since the early 1960s. An early version was called MOLAB, which had a closed cabin and would have massed about 6,000 pounds (2,700 kg); some scaled-down prototypes were tested in Arizona. As it became clear NASA would not soon establish a lunar base, such a large vehicle seemed unnecessary. Still, a rover would enhance the J missions, which were to concentrate on science, though its mass was limited to about 500 pounds (230 kg) and it was not then clear that so light a vehicle could be useful. NASA did not decide to proceed with a rover until May 1969, as Apollo 10, the dress rehearsal for the Moon landing, made its way home from lunar orbit. Boeing received the contract for three rovers on a cost-plus basis; overruns (especially in the navigation system) meant the three vehicles eventually cost a total of $40 million. These cost overruns gained considerable media attention at a time of greater public weariness with the space program, when NASA's budget was being cut.

The Lunar Roving Vehicle could be folded into a space 5 ft by 20 in (1.5 m by 0.5 m). Unloaded, it weighed 460 lb (209 kg) and when carrying two astronauts and their equipment, 1500 lb (700 kg). Each wheel was independently driven by a 1/4 horsepower (200 W) electric motor. Although it could be driven by either astronaut, the commander always drove. Travelling at speeds up to 6 to 8 mph (10 to 12 km/h), astronauts for the first time could travel far afield from their lander and still have enough time to do some scientific experiments. The Apollo 15 rover bore a plaque, reading: "Man's First Wheels on the Moon, Delivered by Falcon, July 30, 1971". During pre-launch testing, the LRV was given additional bracing, lest it collapse if someone sat on it under Earth conditions.

=== Particles and Fields Subsatellite ===
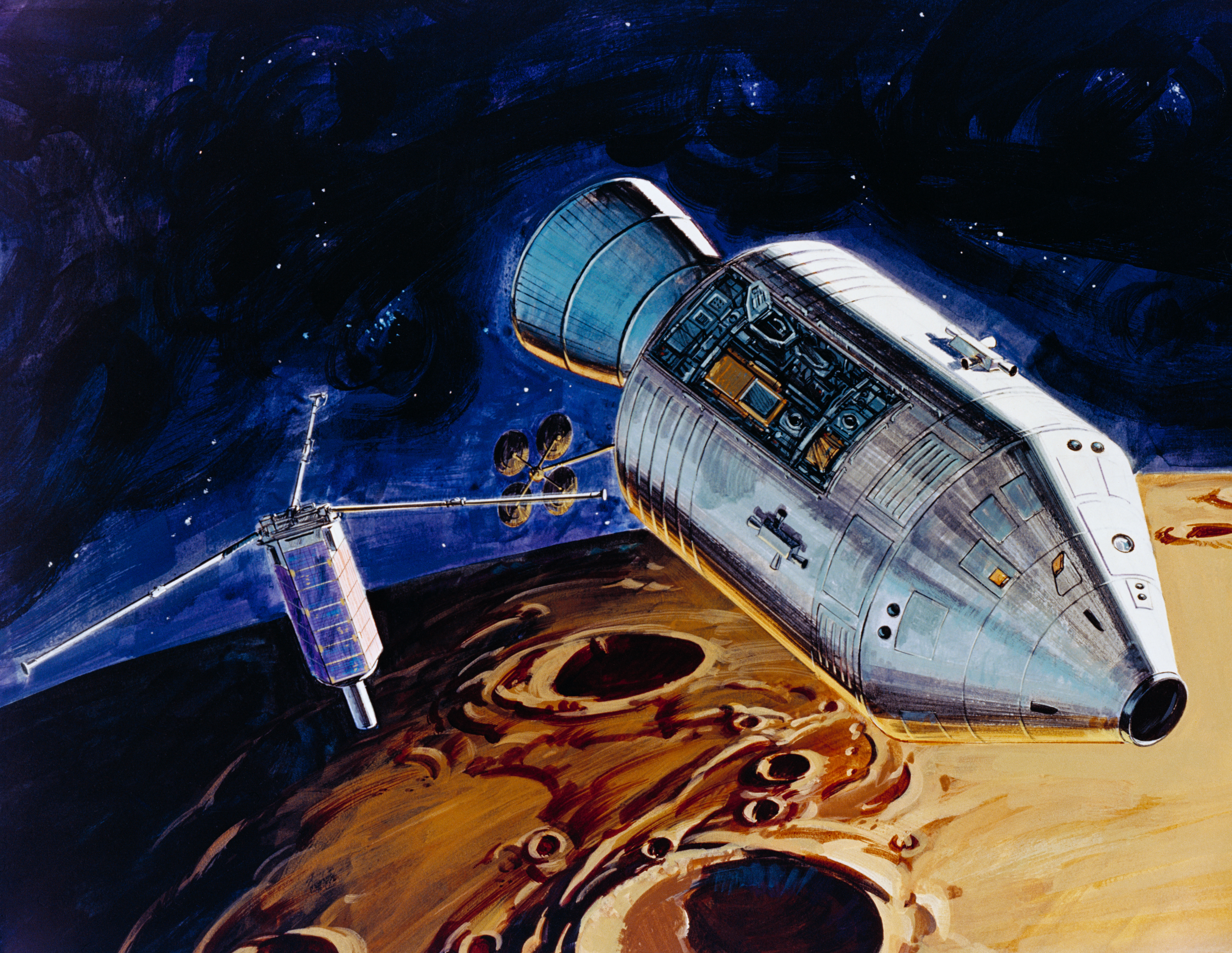
Artist's conception of subsatellite deployment

The Apollo 15 Particles and Fields Subsatellite (PFS-1) was a small satellite released into lunar orbit from the SIM bay just before the mission left orbit to return to Earth. Its main objectives were to study the plasma, particle, and magnetic field environment of the Moon and map the lunar gravity field. Specifically, it measured plasma and energetic particle intensities and vector magnetic fields, and facilitated tracking of the satellite velocity to high precision. A basic requirement was that the satellite acquire fields and particle data everywhere on the orbit around the Moon. As well as measuring magnetic fields, the satellite contained sensors to study the Moon's mass concentrations, or mascons. The satellite orbited the Moon and returned data from August 4, 1971, until January 1973, when, following multiple failures of the subsatellite's electronics, ground support was terminated. It is believed to have crashed into the Moon sometime thereafter.

== Mission highlights ==
=== Launch and outbound trip ===
Apollo 15 launches on July 26, 1971

Apollo 15 was launched on July 26, 1971, at 9:34 am EDT from the Kennedy Space Center at Merritt Island, Florida. The time of launch was at the very start of the two-hour, 37-minute launch window, which would allow Apollo 15 to arrive at the Moon with the proper lighting conditions at Hadley Rille; had the mission been postponed beyond another window on July 27, it could not have been rescheduled until late August. The astronauts had been awakened five and a quarter hours before launch by Slayton, and after breakfast and suiting up, had been taken to Pad 39A, launch site of all seven attempts at crewed lunar landing, and entered the spacecraft about three hours before launch. There were no unplanned delays in the countdown.

At 000:11:36 into the mission, the S-IVB engine shut down, leaving Apollo 15 in its planned parking orbit in low Earth orbit. The mission remained there for 2 hours and 40 minutes, allowing the crew (and Houston, via telemetry) to check the spacecraft's systems. At 002:50.02.6 into the mission, the S-IVB was restarted for trans-lunar injection (TLI), placing the craft on a path to the Moon. Before TLI, the craft had completed 1 1/2 orbits around the Earth.

Command module pilot Al Worden maneuvers the CSM to a docking with the LM

The command and service module (CSM) and the Lunar Module remained attached to the nearly-exhausted S-IVB booster. Once trans-lunar injection had been achieved, placing the spacecraft on a trajectory towards the Moon, explosive cords separated the CSM from the booster as Worden operated the CSM's thrusters to push it away. Worden then maneuvered the CSM to dock with the LM (mounted on the end of the S-IVB), and the combined craft was then separated from the S-IVB by explosives. After Apollo 15 separated from the booster, the S-IVB maneuvered away, and, as planned, impacted the Moon about an hour after the crewed spacecraft entered lunar orbit, though due to an error the impact was 79 nautical miles (146 km) away from the intended target. The booster's impact was detected by the seismometers left on the Moon by Apollo 12 and Apollo 14, providing useful scientific data.

There was a malfunctioning light on the craft's service propulsion system (SPS); after considerable troubleshooting, the astronauts did a test burn of the system that also served as a midcourse correction. This occurred about 028:40:00 into the mission. Fearing that the light meant the SPS might unexpectedly fire, the astronauts avoided using the control bank with the faulty light, bringing it online only for major burns, and controlling it manually. After the mission returned, the malfunction proved to be caused by a tiny bit of wire trapped within the switch.

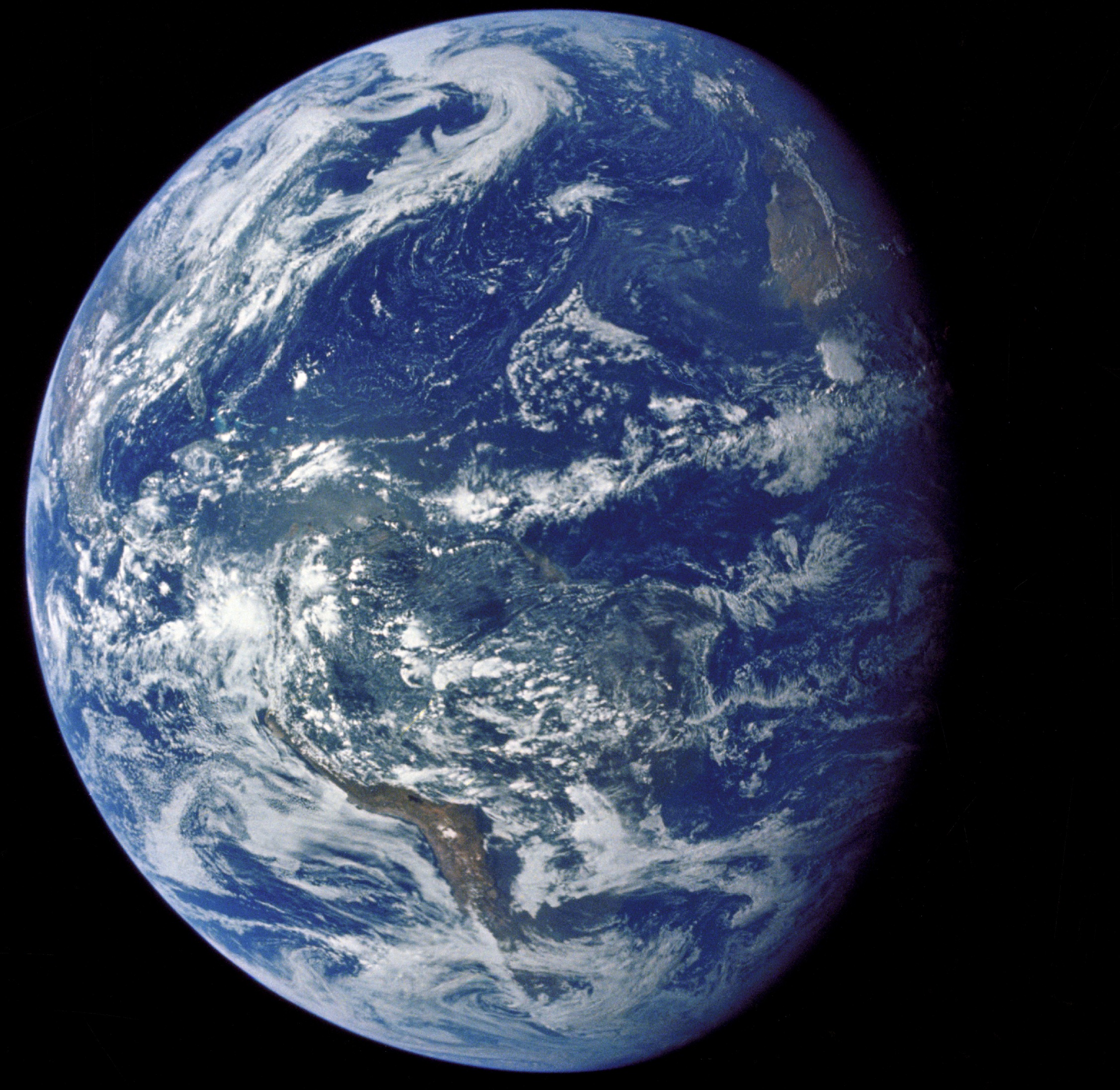
Image of Earth taken during the translunar coast

After purging and renewing the LM's atmosphere to eliminate any contamination, the astronauts entered the LM about 34 hours into the mission, needing to check the condition of its equipment and move in items that would be required on the Moon. Much of this work was televised back to Earth, the camera operated by Worden. The crew discovered a broken outer cover on the Range/Range Rate tapemeter. This was a concern not only because an important piece of equipment, providing information on distance and rate of approach, might not work properly, but because bits of the glass cover were floating around Falcon's interior. The tapemeter was supposed to be in a helium atmosphere, but due to the breakage, it was in the LM's oxygen atmosphere. Testing on the ground verified the tapemeter would still work properly, and the crew removed most of the glass using a vacuum cleaner and adhesive tape.

As yet, there had been only minor problems, but at about 61:15:00 mission time (the evening of July 28 in Houston), Scott discovered a leak in the water system while preparing to chlorinate the water supply. The crew could not tell where it was coming from, and the issue had the potential to become serious. The experts in Houston found a solution, which was successfully implemented by the crew. The water was mopped up with towels, which were then put out to dry in the tunnel between the command module (CM) and Lunar Module—Scott stated it looked like someone's laundry.

At 073:31:14 into the mission, a second midcourse correction, with less than a second of burn, was made. Although there were four opportunities to make midcourse corrections following TLI, only two were needed. Apollo 15 approached the Moon on July 29, and the lunar orbit insertion (LOI) burn had to be made using the SPS, on the far side of the Moon, out of radio contact with Earth. If no burn occurred, Apollo 15 would emerge from the lunar shadow and come back in radio contact faster than expected; the continued lack of communication allowed Mission Control to conclude that the burn had taken place. When contact resumed, Scott did not immediately give the particulars of the burn, but spoke admiringly of the beauty of the Moon, causing Alan Shepard, the Apollo 14 commander, who was awaiting a television interview, to grumble, "To hell with that shit, give us details of the burn." The 398.36-second burn took place at 078:31:46.7 into the mission at an altitude of 86.7 nautical miles (160.6 km) above the Moon, and placed Apollo 15 in an elliptical lunar orbit of 170.1 by 57.7 nautical miles (315.0 by 106.9 km).

=== Lunar orbit and landing ===
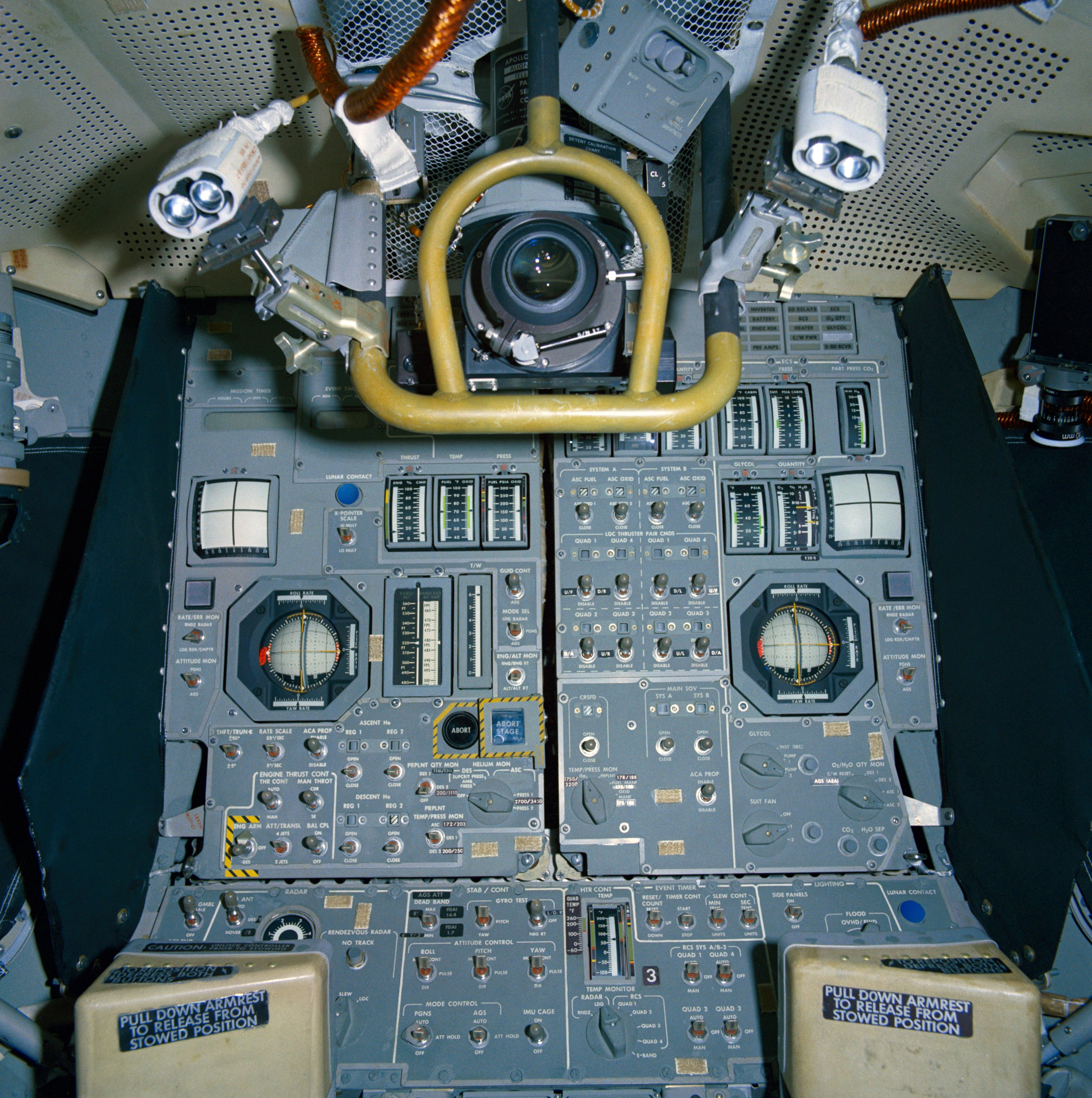
The interior of Falcon

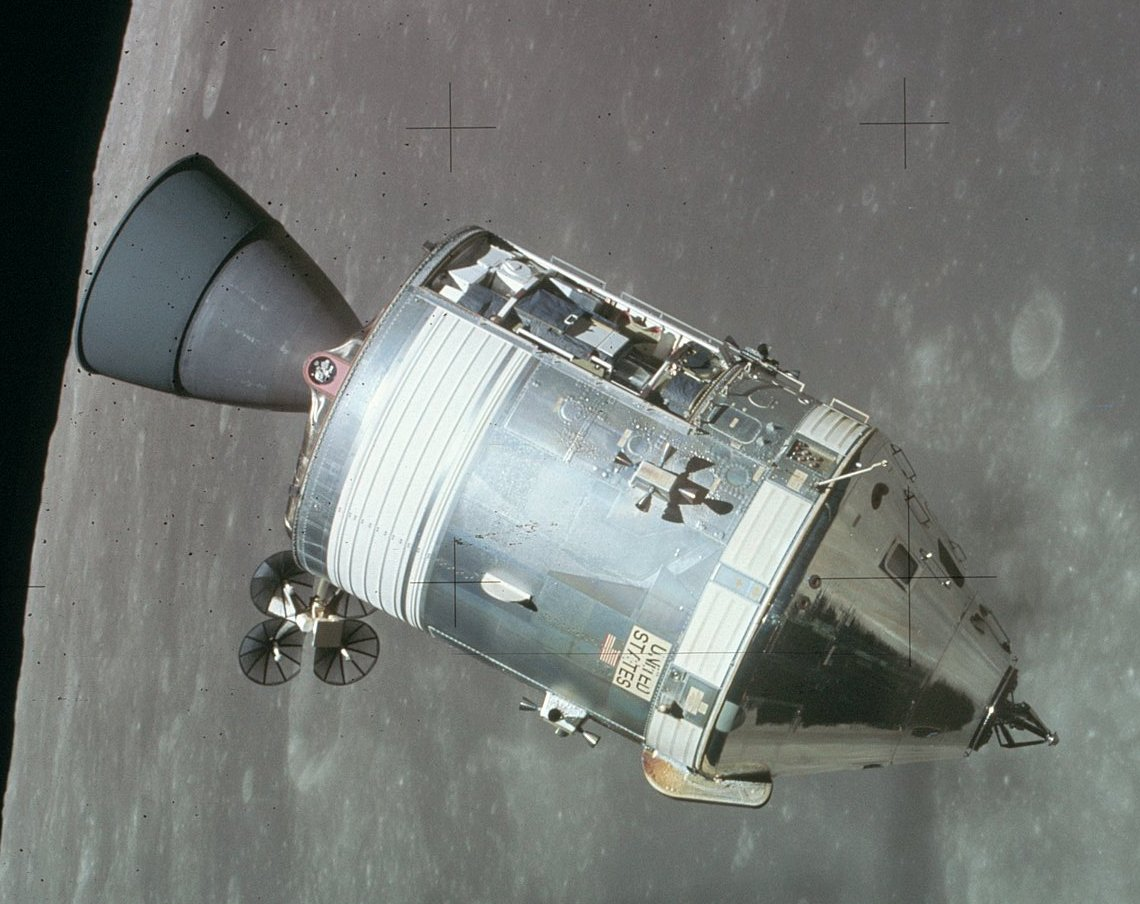
The Apollo 15 command and service module in lunar orbit, photographed from Falcon

On Apollo 11 and 12, the Lunar Module decoupled from the CSM and was piloted to a much lower orbit from which the lunar landing attempt commenced; to save fuel in an increasingly heavy lander, beginning with Apollo 14, the SPS in the service module made that burn, known as descent orbit insertion (DOI), with the lunar module still attached to the CSM. The initial orbit Apollo 15 was in had its apocynthion, or high point, over the landing site at Hadley; a burn at the opposite point in the orbit was performed, with the result that Hadley would now be under the craft's pericynthion, or low point. The DOI burn was performed at 082:39:49.09 and took 24.53 seconds; the result was an orbit with apocynthion of 58.5 nautical miles (108.3 km; 67.3 mi) and pericynthion of 9.6 nautical miles (17.8 km; 11.0 mi). Overnight between July 29 and 30, as the crew rested, it became apparent to Mission Control that mass concentrations in the Moon were making Apollo 15's orbit increasingly elliptical—pericynthion was 7.6 nautical miles (14.1 km; 8.7 mi) by the time the crew was awakened on July 30. This, and uncertainty as to the exact altitude of the landing site, made it desirable that the orbit be modified, or trimmed. Using the craft's RCS thrusters, this took place at 095:56:44.70, lasting 30.40 seconds, and raised the pericynthion to 8.8 nautical miles (16.3 km; 10.1 mi) and the apocynthion to 60.2 nautical miles (111.5 km; 69.3 mi).

As well as preparing the Lunar Module for its descent, the crew continued observations of the Moon (including of the landing site at Hadley) and provided television footage of the surface. Then, Scott and Irwin entered the Lunar Module in preparation for the landing attempt. Undocking was planned for 100:13:56, over the far side of the Moon, but nothing happened when separation was attempted. After analyzing the problem, the crew and Houston decided the probe instrumentation umbilical was likely loose or disconnected; Worden went into the tunnel connecting the command and lunar modules and determined this was so, seating it more firmly. With the problem resolved, Falcon separated from Endeavour at 100:39:16.2, about 25 minutes late, at an altitude of 5.8 nautical miles (10.7 km; 6.7 mi). Worden in Endeavour executed a SPS burn at 101:38:58.98 to send Endeavour to an orbit of 65.2 nautical miles (120.8 km; 75.0 mi) by 54.8 nautical miles (101.5 km; 63.1 mi) in preparation for his scientific work.

Aboard Falcon, Scott and Irwin prepared for powered descent initiation (PDI), the burn that was to place them on the lunar surface, and, after Mission Control gave them permission, they initiated PDI at 104:30:09.4 at an altitude of 5.8 nautical miles (10.7 km; 6.7 mi), slightly higher than planned. During the first part of the descent, Falcon was aligned so the astronauts were on their backs and thus could not see the lunar surface below them, but after the craft made a pitchover maneuver, they were upright and could see the surface in front of them. Scott, who as commander performed the landing, was confronted with a landscape that did not at first seem to resemble what he had seen during simulations. Part of this was due to an error in the landing path of some 3,000 feet (910 m), of which CAPCOM Ed Mitchell informed the crew prior to pitchover; part because the craters Scott had relied on in the simulator were difficult to make out under lunar conditions, and he initially could not see Hadley Rille. He concluded that they were likely to overshoot the planned landing site, and, once he could see the rille, started maneuvering the vehicle to move the computer's landing target back towards the planned spot, and looked for a relatively smooth place to land.

Apollo 15 landing on the Moon at Hadley, seen from the perspective of the Lunar Module Pilot. Starts at about 5,000 feet (1,500 m).

Below about 60 feet (18 m), Scott could see nothing of the surface because of the quantities of lunar dust being displaced by Falcon's exhaust. Falcon had a larger engine bell than previous LMs, in part to accommodate a heavier load, and the importance of shutting down the engine at initial contact rather than risk "blowback", the exhaust reflecting off the lunar surface and going back into the engine (possibly causing an explosion) had been impressed on the astronauts by mission planners. Thus, when Irwin called "Contact", indicating that one of the probes on the landing leg extensions had touched the surface, Scott immediately shut off the engine, letting the lander fall the remaining distance to the surface. Already moving downward at about 1/2 foot per second (0.34 mph; 0.15 m/s), Falcon dropped from a height of 1.6 feet (0.49 m). Scott's speed resulted in what was likely the hardest lunar landing of any of the crewed missions, at about 6.8 feet per second (4.6 mph; 2.1 m/s), causing a startled Irwin to exclaim "Bam!" Scott had landed Falcon on the rim of a small crater he could not see, and the lander settled back at an angle of 6.9 degrees and to the left of 8.6 degrees. Irwin described it in his autobiography as the hardest landing he had ever been in, and he feared that the craft would keep tipping over, forcing an immediate abort.

Falcon landed at 104:42:29.3 (22:16:29 GMT on July 30), with approximately 103 seconds of fuel remaining and about 1,800 feet (550 m) from the planned landing site. After Irwin's exclamation, Scott reported, "Okay, Houston. The Falcon is on the Plain at Hadley." (Note: The Plain was a shoutout to Scott's alma mater, West Point, as that is the name of the parade ground there.) Once within the planned landing zone, the increased mobility provided by the Lunar Roving Vehicle made unnecessary any further maneuvering.

=== Lunar surface ===
==== Stand-up EVA and first EVA ====
As I stand out here in the wonders of the unknown at Hadley, I sort of realize there's a fundamental truth to our nature. Man must explore. And this is exploration at its greatest.

— David Scott, upon setting foot on the Moon.

With Falcon due to remain on the lunar surface for almost three days, Scott deemed it important to maintain the circadian rhythm they were used to, and as they had landed in the late afternoon, Houston time, the two astronauts were to sleep before going onto the surface. But the time schedule allowed Scott to open the lander's top hatch (usually used for docking) and spend a half hour looking at their surroundings, describing them, and taking photographs. Lee Silver had taught him the importance of going to a high place to survey a new field site, and the top hatch served that purpose. Deke Slayton and other managers were initially opposed due to the oxygen that would be lost, but Scott got his way. During the only stand-up extravehicular activity (EVA) ever performed through the LM's top hatch on the lunar surface, Scott was able to make plans for the following day's EVA. He offered Irwin a chance to look out as well, but this would have required rearranging the umbilicals connecting Irwin to Falcon's life support system, and he declined. After repressurizing the spacecraft, Scott and Irwin removed their space suits for sleep, becoming the first astronauts to doff their suits while on the Moon.

Aboard the Lunar Roving Vehicle

Throughout the sleep period Mission Control in Houston monitored a slow but steady oxygen loss. Scott and Irwin eventually were awakened an hour early, and the source of the problem was found to be an open valve on the urine transfer device. In post-mission debriefing, Scott recommended that future crews be woken at once under similar circumstances. After the problem was solved, the crew began preparation for the first Moon walk.

After donning their suits and depressurizing the cabin, Scott and Irwin began their first full EVA, becoming the seventh and eighth humans, respectively, to walk on the Moon. They began deploying the lunar rover, stored folded up in a compartment of Falcon's descent stage, but this proved troublesome due to the slant of the lander. The experts in Houston suggested lifting the front end of the rover as the astronauts pulled it out, and this worked. Scott began a system checkout. One of the batteries gave a zero voltage reading, but this was only an instrumentation problem. A greater concern was that the front wheel steering would not work. However, the rear wheel steering was sufficient to maneuver the vehicle. Completing his checkout, Scott said "Okay. Out of detent; we're moving", maneuvering the rover away from Falcon in mid-sentence. These were the first words uttered by a human while driving a vehicle on the Moon. The rover carried a television camera, controlled remotely from Houston by NASA's Ed Fendell. The resolution was not high compared to the still photographs that would be taken, but the camera allowed the geologists on Earth to indirectly participate in Scott and Irwin's activities.

The rille was not visible from the landing site, but as Scott and Irwin drove over the rolling terrain, it came into view. They were able to see Elbow crater, and they began to drive in that direction. Reaching Elbow, a known location, allowed Mission Control to backtrack and get closer to pinpointing the location of the lander. The astronauts took samples there, and then drove to another crater on the flank of Mons Hadley Delta, where they took more. After concluding this stop, they returned to the lander to drop off their samples and prepare to set up the Apollo Lunar Surface Experiments Package (ALSEP), the scientific instruments that would remain when they left. Scott had difficulty drilling the holes required for the heat flow experiment, and the work was not completed when they had to return to the lander. The first EVA lasted 6 hours and 32 minutes.

==== Second and third EVAs ====
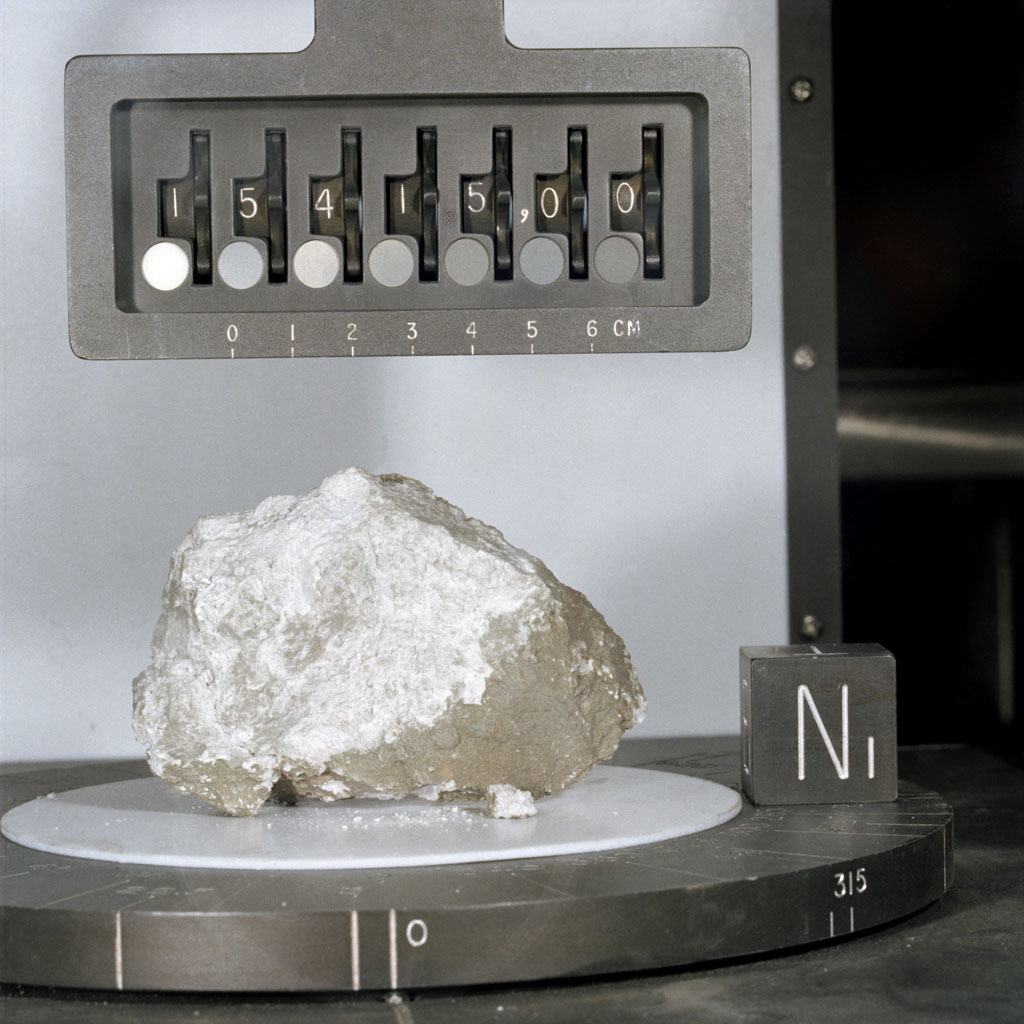
The Genesis Rock

The rover's front steering, inoperative during the first EVA, worked during the second and third ones. The target of the second EVA, on August 1, was the slope of Mons Hadley Delta, where the pair sampled boulders and craters along the Apennine Front. They spent an hour at Spur crater, during which the astronauts collected a sample dubbed the Genesis Rock. This rock, an anorthosite, is believed to be part of the early lunar crust—the hope of finding such a specimen had been one reason the Hadley area had been chosen. Once back at the landing site, Scott continued to try to drill holes for experiments at the ALSEP site, with which he had struggled the day before. After conducting soil-mechanics experiments and raising the U.S. flag, Scott and Irwin returned to the LM. EVA 2 lasted 7 hours and 12 minutes.

Although Scott had eventually been successful at drilling the holes, he and Irwin had been unable to retrieve a core sample, and this was an early order of business during EVA 3, their third and final moonwalk. Time that could have been devoted to geology ticked away as Scott and Irwin attempted to pull it out. Once it had been retrieved, more time passed as they attempted to break the core into pieces for transport to Earth. Hampered by an incorrectly mounted vise on the rover, they eventually gave up on this—the core would be transported home with one segment longer than planned. Scott wondered if the core was worth the amount of time and effort invested, and the CAPCOM, Joe Allen, assured him it was. The core proved one of the most important items brought back from the Moon, revealing much about its history, but the expended time meant the planned visit to a group of hills known as the North Complex had to be scrubbed. Instead, the crew again ventured to the edge of Hadley Rille, this time to the northwest of the immediate landing site.

David Scott's hammer and feather experiment

Once the astronauts were beside the LM, Scott used a kit provided by the Postal Service to cancel a first day cover of two stamps being issued on August 2, the current date. Scott then performed an experiment in view of the television camera, using a falcon feather and hammer to demonstrate Galileo's theory that all objects in a given gravity field fall at the same rate, regardless of mass, in the absence of aerodynamic drag. He dropped the hammer and feather at the same time; because of the negligible lunar atmosphere, there was no drag on the feather, which hit the ground at the same time as the hammer. This was Joe Allen's idea (he also served as CAPCOM during it) and was part of an effort to find a memorable popular science experiment to do on the Moon along the lines of Shepard's hitting of golf balls. The feather was most likely from a female gyrfalcon (a type of falcon), a mascot at the United States Air Force Academy.

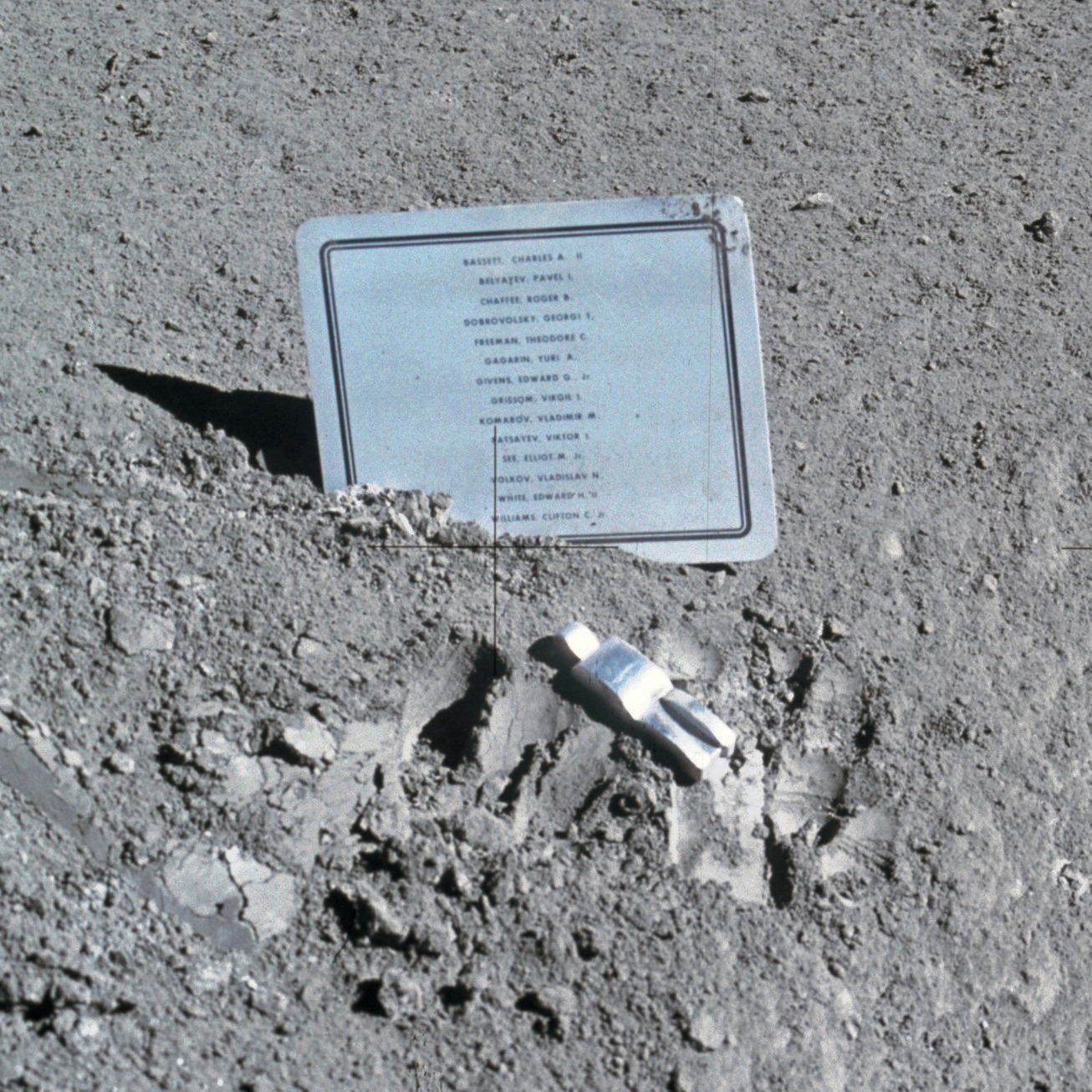
The Fallen Astronaut memorial, near Hadley Rille, Moon

Scott then drove the rover to a position away from the LM, where the television camera could be used to observe the lunar liftoff. Near the rover, he left a small aluminum statuette called Fallen Astronaut, along with a plaque bearing the names of 14 known American astronauts and Soviet cosmonauts who had died in the furtherance of space exploration. The memorial was left while the television camera was turned away; he told Mission Control he was doing some cleanup activities around the rover. Scott disclosed the memorial in a post-flight news conference. He also placed a Bible on the control panel of the rover before leaving it for the last time to enter the LM.

The EVA lasted 4 hours, 49 minutes and 50 seconds. In total, the two astronauts spent 18 1/2 hours outside the LM and collected approximately 170 lb (77 kg) of lunar samples.

=== Command module activities ===
After the departure of Falcon, Worden in Endeavour executed a burn to take the CSM to a higher orbit. While Falcon was on the Moon, the mission effectively split, Worden and the CSM being assigned their own CAPCOM and flight support team.

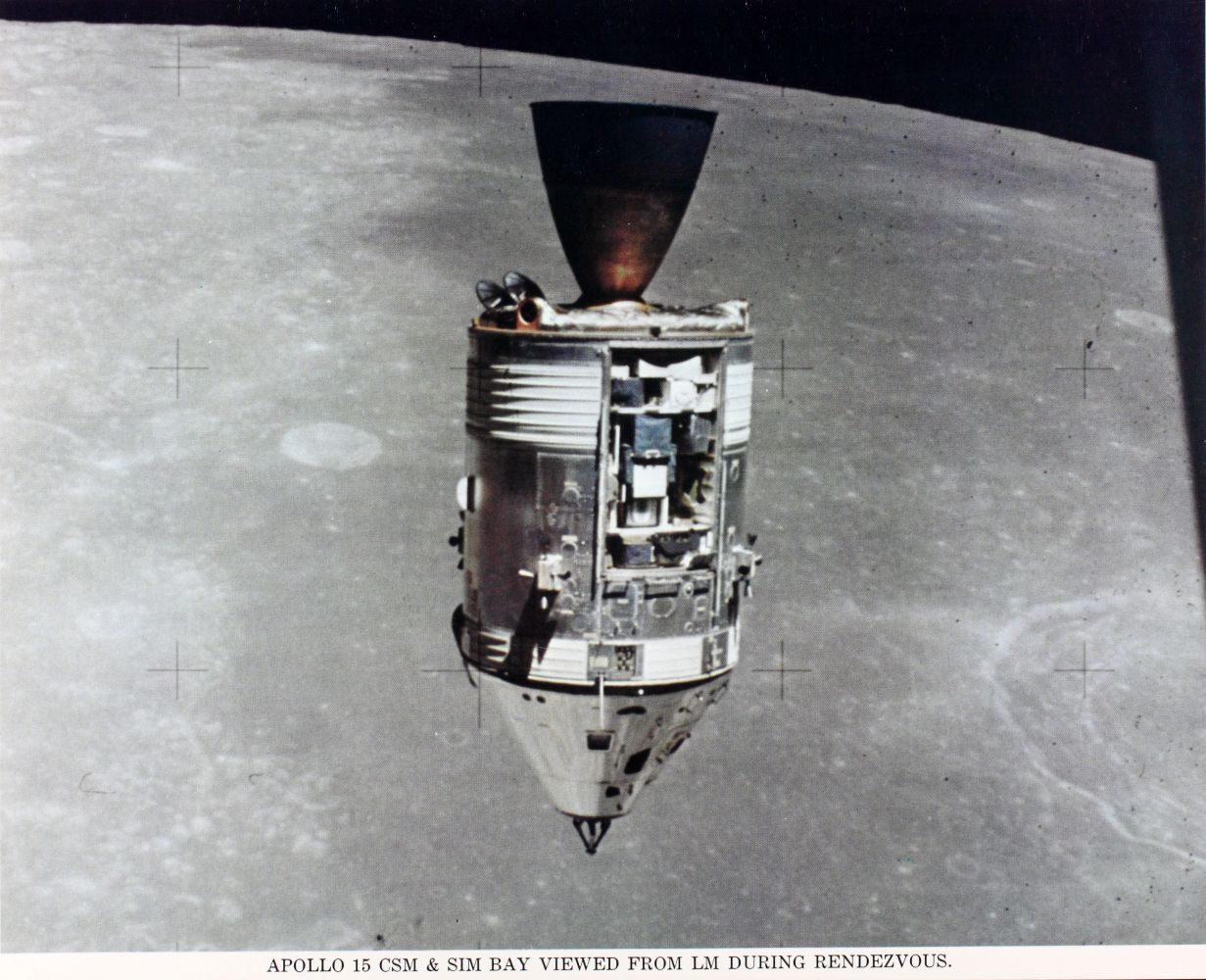
Endeavour, with the SIM bay exposed, as seen from the Lunar Module Falcon

Worden got busy with the tasks that were to occupy him for much of the time he spent in space alone: photography and operating the instruments in the SIM bay. The door to the SIM bay had been explosively jettisoned during the translunar coast. Filling previously unused space in the service module, the SIM bay contained a gamma-ray spectrometer, mounted on the end of a boom, an X-ray spectrometer and a laser altimeter, which failed part way through the mission. Two cameras, a stellar camera and a metric camera, together comprised the mapping camera, which was complemented by a panoramic camera, derived from spy technology. The altimeter and cameras permitted the exact time and location from which pictures were taken to be determined. Also present were an alpha particle spectrometer, which could be used to detect evidence of lunar volcanism, and a mass spectrometer, also on a boom in the hope it would be unaffected by contamination from the ship. The boom would prove troublesome, as Worden would not always be able to get it to retract.

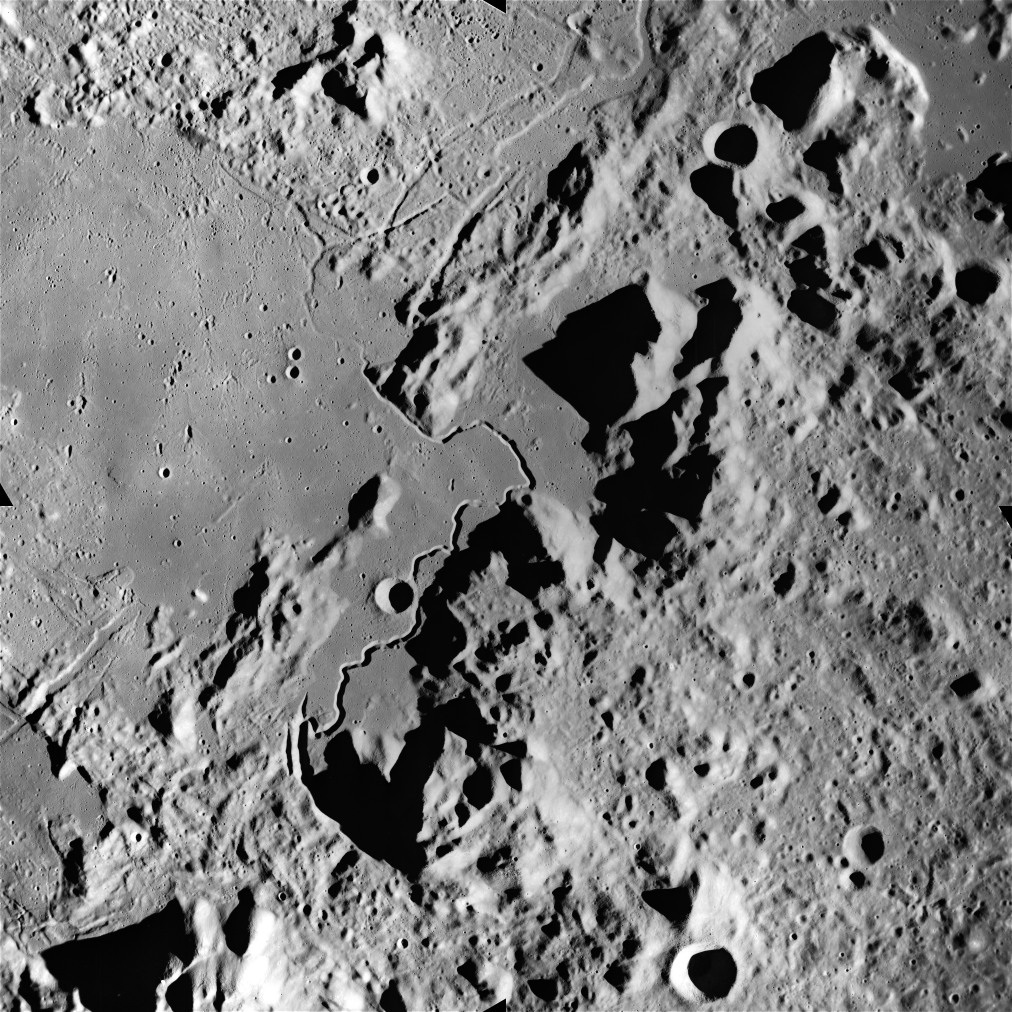
The landing area is shown in an image taken by the mapping camera

Endeavour was slated to pass over the landing site at the moment of planned landing, but Worden could not see Falcon and did not spot it until a subsequent orbit. He also exercised to avoid muscle atrophy, and Houston kept him up to date on Scott and Irwin's activities on the lunar surface. The panoramic camera did not operate perfectly, but provided enough images that no special adjustment was made. Worden took many photographs through the command module's windows, often with shots taken at regular intervals. His task was complicated by the lack of a working mission timer in the Lower Equipment Bay of the command module, as its circuit breaker had popped en route to the Moon. Worden's observations and photographs would inform the decision to send Apollo 17 to Taurus-Littrow to search for evidence of volcanic activity. There was a communications blackout when the CSM passed over the far side of the Moon from Earth; Worden greeted each resumption of contact with the words, "Hello, Earth. Greetings from Endeavour", expressed in different languages. Worden and El-Baz had come up with the idea, and the geology instructor had aided the astronaut in accumulating translations.

Results from the SIM bay experiments would include the conclusion, from data gathered by the X-ray spectrometer, that there was greater fluorescent X-ray flux than anticipated, and that the lunar highlands were richer in aluminum than were the mares. Endeavour was in a more inclined orbit than previous crewed missions, and Worden saw features that were not known previously, supplementing photographs with thorough descriptions.

By the time Scott and Irwin were ready to take off from the lunar surface and return to Endeavour, the CSM's orbit had drifted due to the rotation of the Moon, and a plane change burn was required to ensure that the CSM's orbit would be in the same plane as that of the LM once it took off from the Moon. Worden accomplished the 18-second burn with the SPS.

=== Return to Earth ===
The liftoff from the Moon as seen by the TV camera on the lunar rover

Falcon lifted off the Moon at 17:11:22 GMT on August 2 after 66 hours and 55 minutes on the lunar surface. Docking with the CSM took place just under two hours later. After the astronauts transferred samples and other items from the LM to the CSM, the LM was sealed off, jettisoned, and intentionally crashed into the lunar surface, an impact registered by the seismometers left by Apollo 12, 14 and 15. The jettison proved difficult because of problems getting airtight seals, requiring a delay in discarding the LM. After the jettison, Slayton came on the loop to recommend the astronauts take sleeping pills, or at least that Scott and Irwin do so. Scott as mission commander refused to allow it, feeling there was no need. During the EVAs, the doctors had noticed irregularities in both Scott's and Irwin's heartbeats, but the crew were not informed during the flight. Irwin had heart problems after retiring as an astronaut and died in 1991 of a heart attack; Scott felt that he as commander should have been informed of the biomedical readings. NASA doctors at the time theorized the heart readings were due to potassium deficiency, due to their hard work on the surface and inadequate resupply through liquids.

Worden's deep space EVA

The crew spent the next two days working on orbital science experiments, including more observations of the Moon from orbit and releasing the subsatellite. Endeavour departed lunar orbit with another burn of the SPS engine of 2 minutes 21 seconds at 21:22:45 GMT on August 4. The next day, during the return to Earth, Worden performed a 39-minute EVA to retrieve film cassettes from the service module's scientific instrument module (SIM) bay, with assistance from Irwin who remained at the command module's hatch. At approximately 171,000 nautical miles (197,000 mi; 317,000 km) from Earth, it was the first "deep space" EVA in history, performed at great distance from any planetary body. As of 2026, it remains one of only three such EVAs, all performed during Apollo's J missions under similar circumstances. Later that day, the crew set a record for the longest Apollo flight to that point.

On approach to Earth on August 7, the service module was jettisoned, and the command module reentered the Earth's atmosphere. Although one of the three parachutes on the CM failed after deploying, likely due to damage as the spacecraft vented fuel, only two were required for a safe landing (one extra for redundancy). Upon landing in the North Pacific Ocean, the CM and crew were recovered and taken aboard the recovery ship, USS Okinawa, after a mission lasting 12 days, 7 hours, 11 minutes and 53 seconds.

== Assessment ==
The mission objectives for Apollo 15 were to "perform selenological inspection, survey, and sampling of materials and surface features in a pre-selected area of the Hadley–Apennine region. Emplace and activate surface experiments. Evaluate the capability of the Apollo equipment to provide extended lunar surface stay time, increased extravehicular operations, and surface mobility. [and] Conduct inflight experiments and photographic tasks from lunar orbit." It achieved all those objectives. The mission also completed a long list of other tasks, including experiments. One of the photographic objectives, to obtain images of the gegenschein from lunar orbit, was not completed, as the camera was not pointed at the proper spot in the sky. According to the conclusions in the Apollo 15 Mission Report, the journey "was the fourth lunar landing and resulted in the collection of a wealth of scientific information. The Apollo system, in addition to providing a means of transportation, excelled as an operational scientific facility."

Apollo 15 saw an increase in public interest in the Apollo program, in part due to fascination with the LRV, as well as the attractiveness of the Hadley Rille site and the increased television coverage. According to David Woods in the Apollo Lunar Flight Journal,

Though subsequent missions travelled further on the Moon, brought back more samples and put the lessons of Apollo 15 into practice, this feat of unalloyed exploration still stands out as a great moment of human achievement. It is remembered still for its combination of competent enthusiasm, magnificent machinery, finely honed science and the grandeur of a very special site in the cosmos beside a meandering rille and graceful, massive mountains – Hadley Base.

== Controversies ==
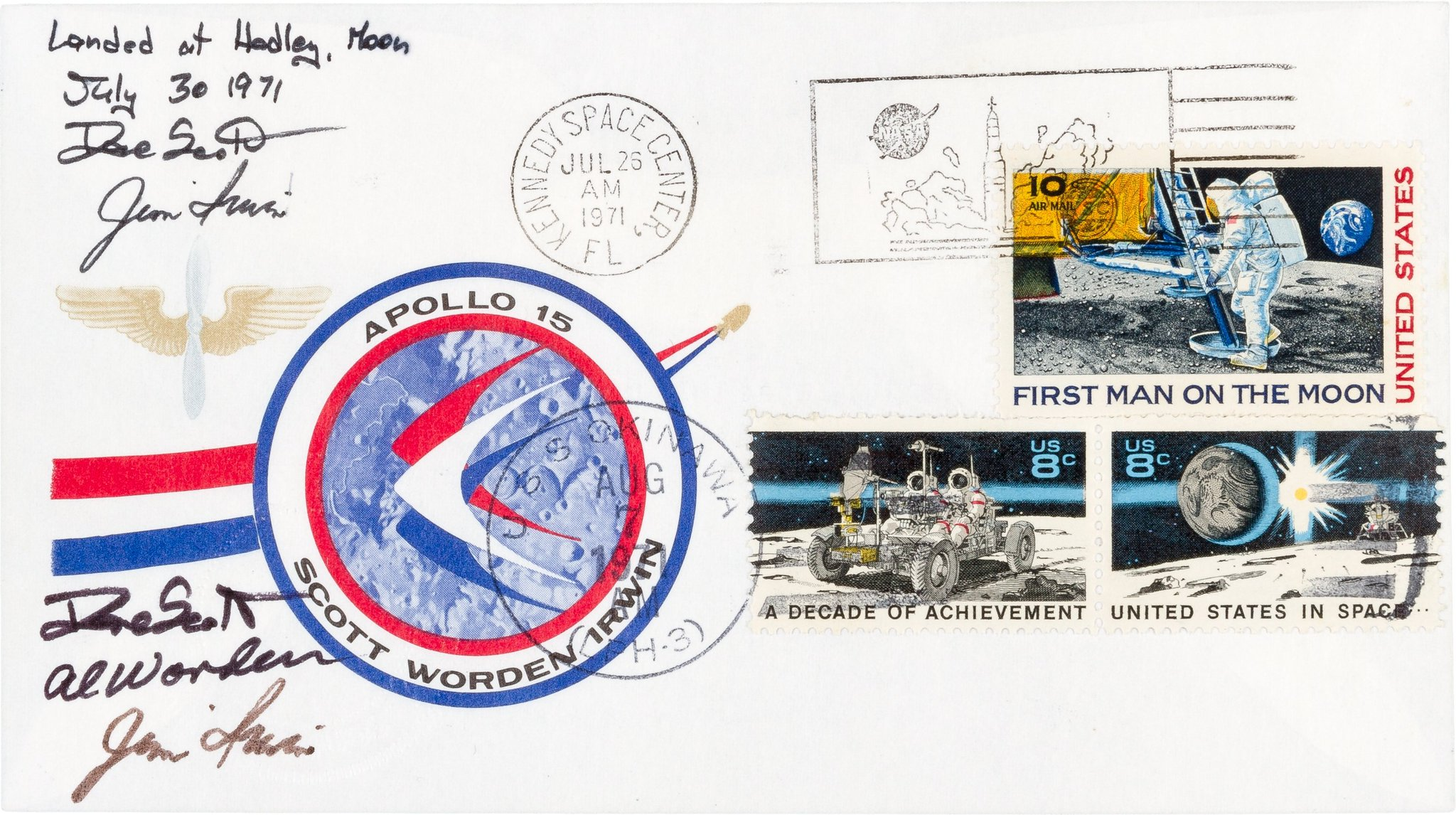
A "Sieger cover"

Despite the successful mission, the careers of the crew were tarnished by a deal they had made before the flight to carry postal covers to the Moon in exchange for about $7,000 each, which they planned to set aside for their children. Walter Eiermann, who had many professional and social contacts with NASA employees and the astronaut corps, served as intermediary between the astronauts and a West German stamp dealer, Hermann Sieger, and Scott carried about 400 covers onto the spacecraft; they were subsequently transferred into Falcon and remained inside the lander during the astronauts' activities on the surface of the Moon. After the return to Earth, 100 of the covers were given to Eiermann, who passed them on to Sieger, receiving a commission. No permission had been received from Slayton to carry the covers, as required.

The 100 covers were put on sale to Sieger's customers in late 1971 at a price of about $1,500 each. After receiving the agreed payments, the astronauts returned them, and accepted no compensation. In April 1972, Slayton learned that unauthorized covers had been carried, and removed the three as the backup crew for Apollo 17. The matter became public in June 1972 and the three astronauts were reprimanded for poor judgment; none ever flew in space again. During the investigation, the astronauts had surrendered those covers still in their possession; after Worden filed suit, they were returned in 1983, something Slate magazine deemed an exoneration.

Another controversy arose later, this time surrounding the Fallen Astronaut statuette that Scott had left on the Moon. Before the mission, Scott had made a verbal agreement with Belgian artist Paul Van Hoeydonck to sculpt the statuette. Scott's intent, in keeping with NASA's strict policy against commercial exploitation of the US government's space program, was for a simple memorial with a minimum of publicity, keeping the artist anonymous, no commercial replicas being made except for a single copy for public exhibit at the National Air and Space Museum commissioned after the sculpture's public disclosure during the post-flight press conference. Van Hoeydonck claims to have had a different understanding of the agreement, by which he would have received recognition as the creator of a tribute to human space exploration, with rights to sell replicas to the public. Under pressure from NASA, Van Hoeydonck canceled a plan to publicly sell 950 signed copies.

In 2021, Scott published a document entitled "Memorandum for the Record", in which he stated that the figurine left on the Moon was designed and fabricated by NASA personnel. While testifying before a Senate committee in 1972, he had stated that the figurine had been made and provided by Van Hoeydonck at Scott's request.

During those congressional hearings into the postal covers and Fallen Astronaut matters, two Bulova timepieces taken on the mission by Scott were also matters of controversy. Before the mission, Scott had been introduced to Bulova's representative, General James McCormack by Apollo 8 commander Frank Borman. Bulova had been seeking to have its timepieces taken on Apollo missions, but after evaluation, NASA had selected Omega watches instead. Scott brought the Bulova timepieces on the mission, without disclosing them to Slayton. During Scott's second EVA, the crystal on his NASA standard issue Omega Speedmaster watch popped off, and, during the third EVA, he used a Bulova watch. The Bulova Chronograph Model #88510/01 that Scott wore on the lunar surface was a prototype, given to him by the Bulova Company, and it is the only privately owned watch to have been worn while walking on the lunar surface. There are images of him wearing this watch, when he saluted the American flag on the Moon, with the Hadley Delta expanse in the background. In 2015, the watch sold for $1.625 million, which makes it one of the most expensive astronaut-owned artifact ever sold at auction and one of the most expensive watches sold at auction.

== Mission insignia ==
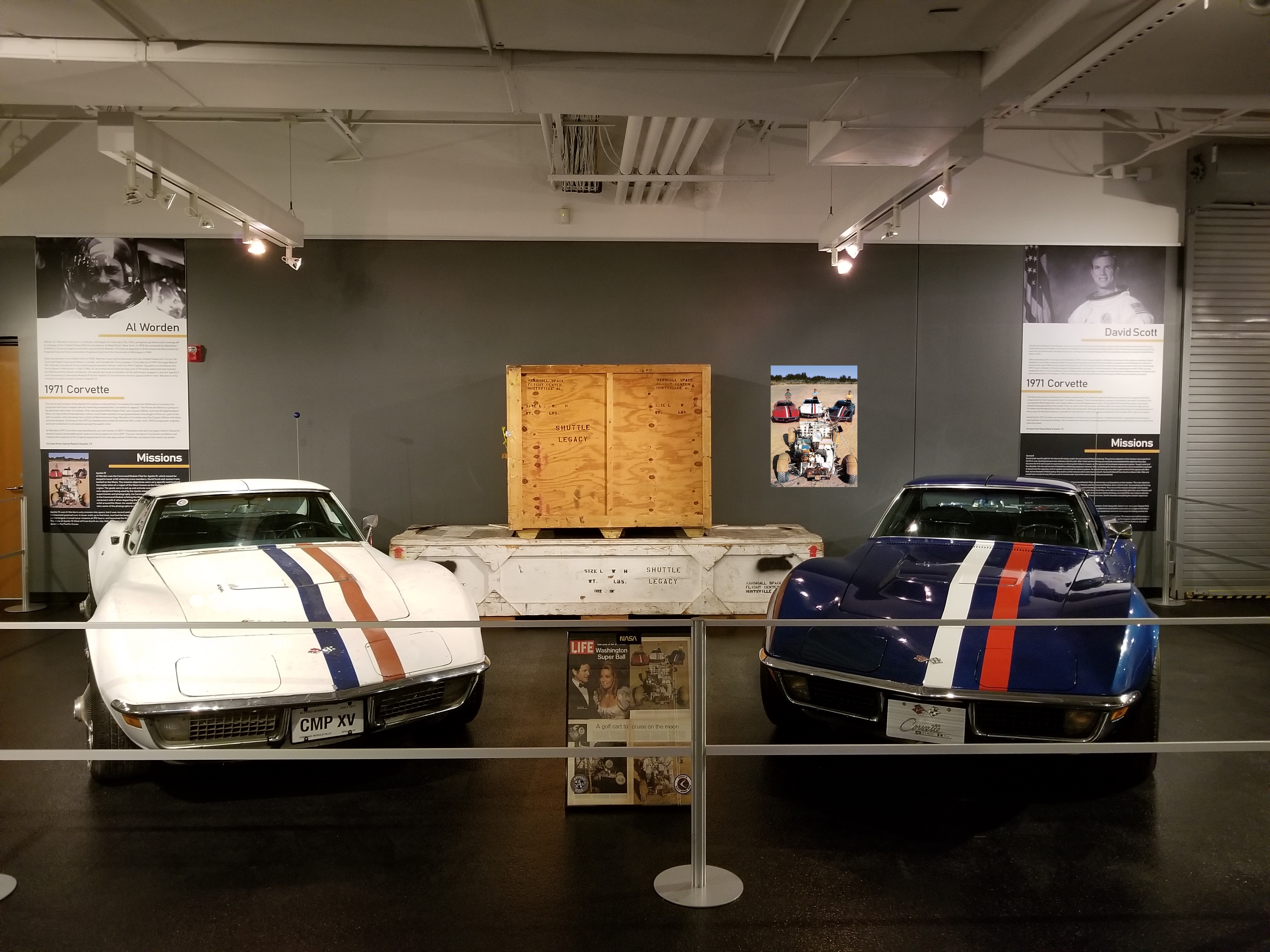
The Chevrolet Corvettes driven by Scott (right) and Worden during the training for Apollo 15, photographed in 2019

The Apollo 15 mission patch carries Air Force motifs, a nod to the crew's service there, just as the Apollo 12 all-Navy crew's patch had featured a sailing ship. The circular patch features stylized red, white and blue birds flying over Hadley Rille. Immediately behind the birds, a line of craters forms the Roman numeral XV. The Roman numerals were hidden in emphasized outlines of some craters after NASA insisted that the mission number be displayed in Arabic numerals. The artwork is circled in red, with a white band giving the mission and crew names and a blue border. Scott contacted fashion designer Emilio Pucci to design the patch, who came up with the basic idea of the three-bird motif on a square patch.

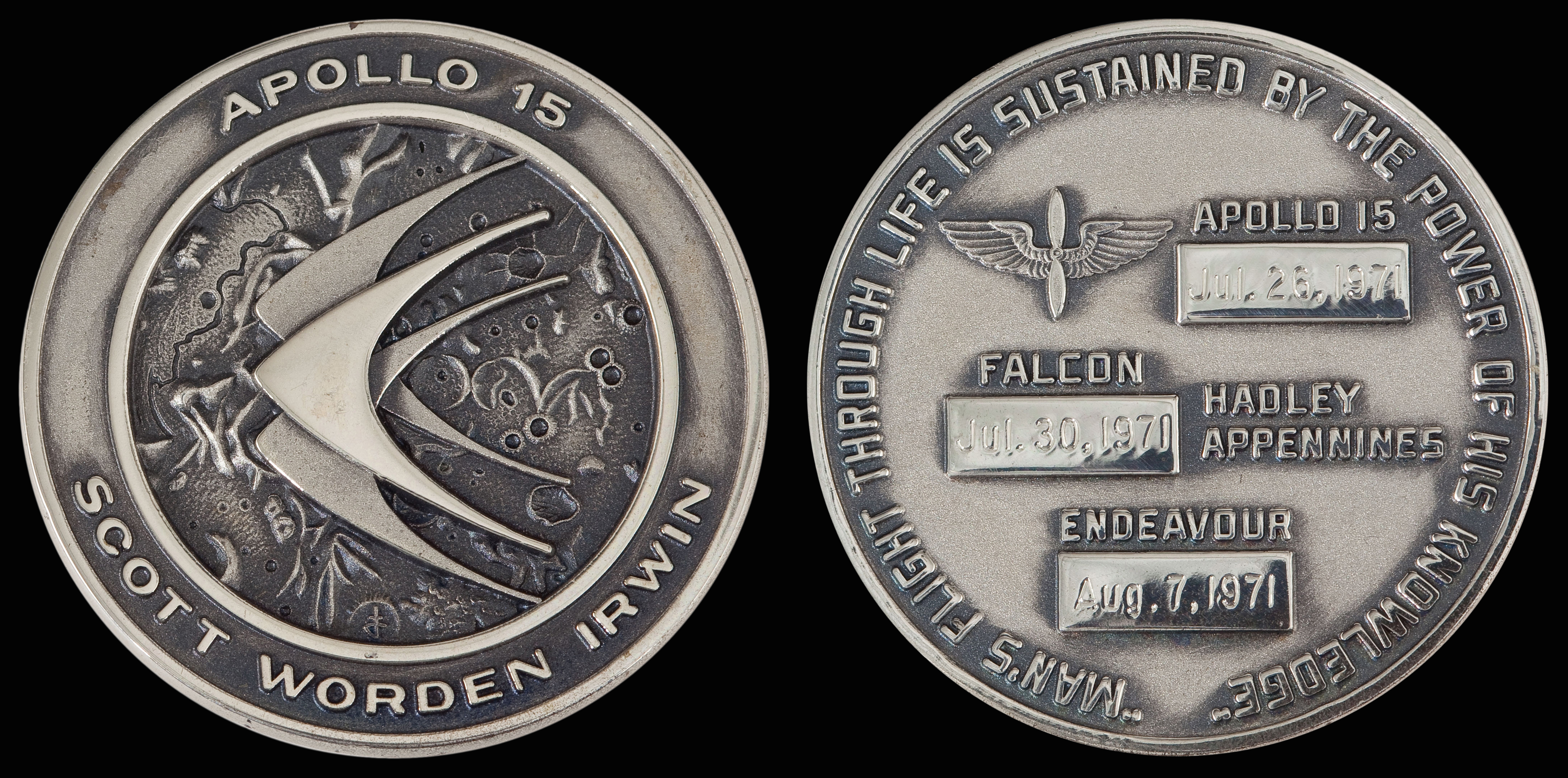
Apollo 15 space-flown silver Robbins medallion

The crew changed the shape to round and the colors from blues and greens to a patriotic red, white and blue. Worden stated that each bird also represented an astronaut, white being his own color (and as Command Module Pilot, uppermost), Scott being the blue bird and Irwin the red. The colors matched Chevrolet Corvettes leased by the astronauts at KSC; a Florida car dealer had, since the time of Project Mercury, been leasing Chevrolets to astronauts for $1 and later selling them to the public. The astronauts were photographed with the cars and the training LRV for the June 11, 1971, edition of Life magazine.

== Visibility from space ==
The halo area of the Apollo 15 landing site, created by the LM's exhaust plume, was observed by a camera aboard the Japanese lunar orbiter SELENE and confirmed by comparative analysis of photographs in May 2008. This corresponds well to photographs taken from the Apollo 15 command module showing a change in surface reflectivity due to the plume, and was the first visible trace of crewed landings on the Moon seen from space since the close of the Apollo program.

== Gallery ==
=== Still images ===
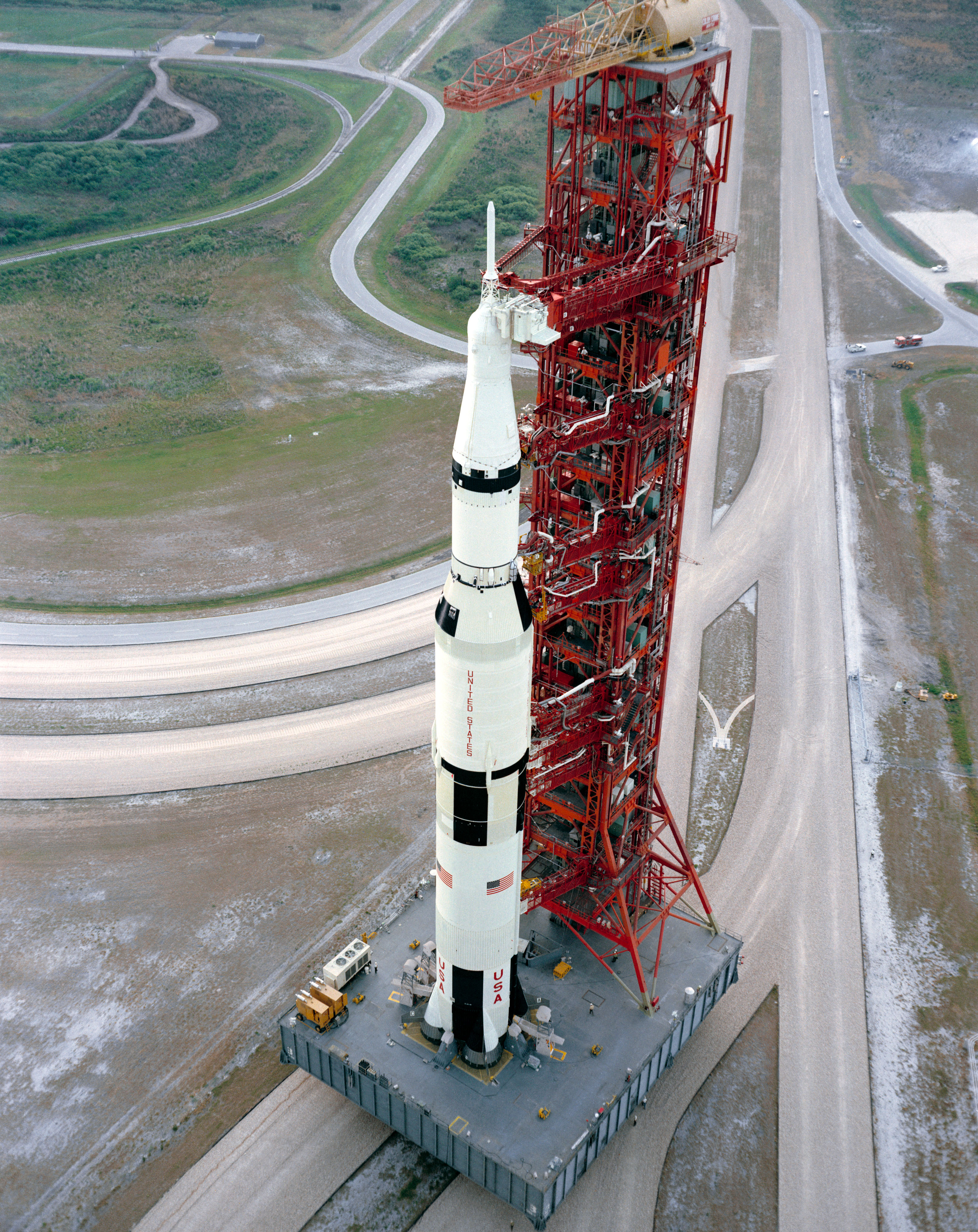
The Apollo 15 launch vehicle during rollout

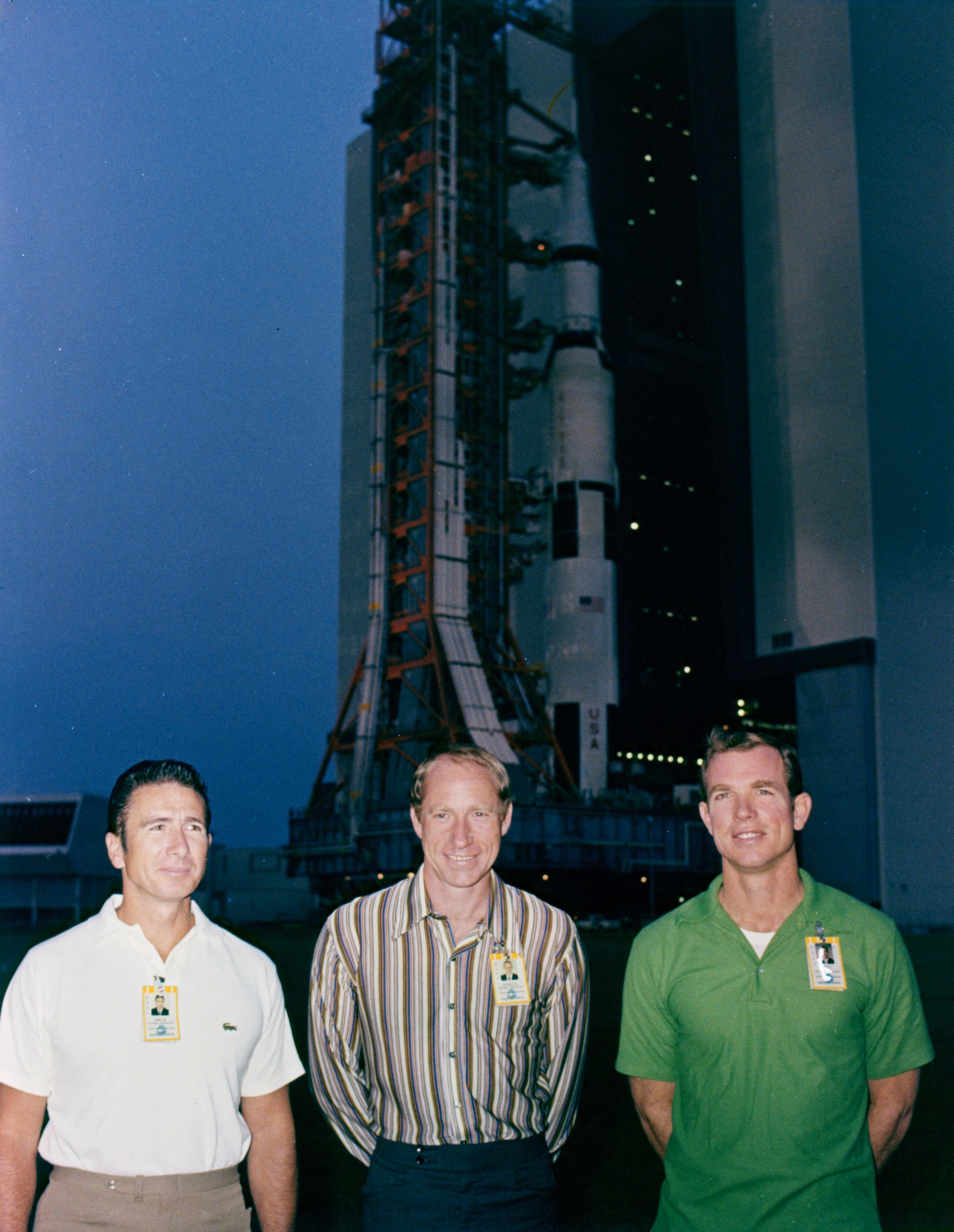
The astronauts pose before the Vehicle Assembly Building as the Saturn V is rolled out

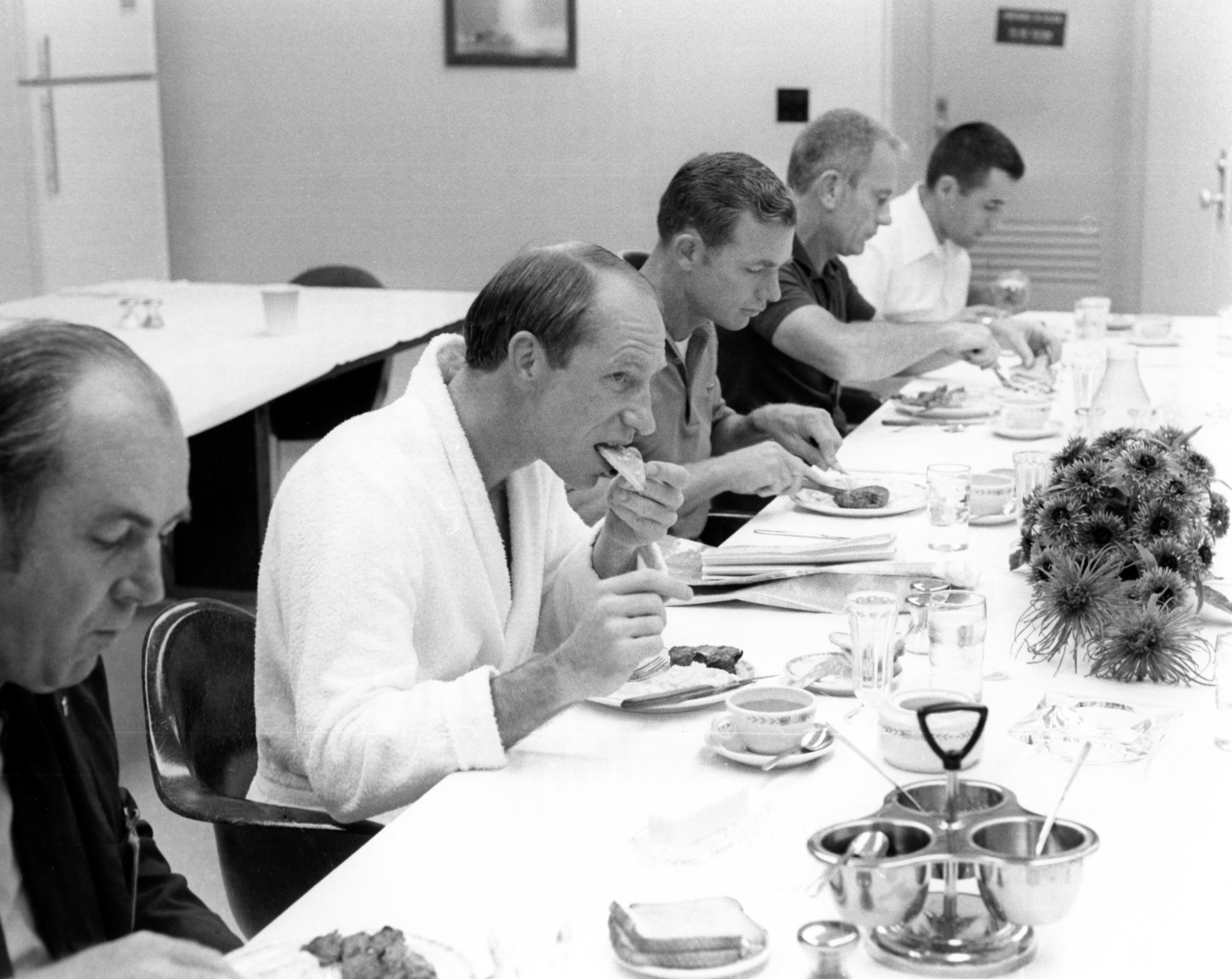
Worden, Scott, Slayton and Schmitt eat the pre-launch breakfast

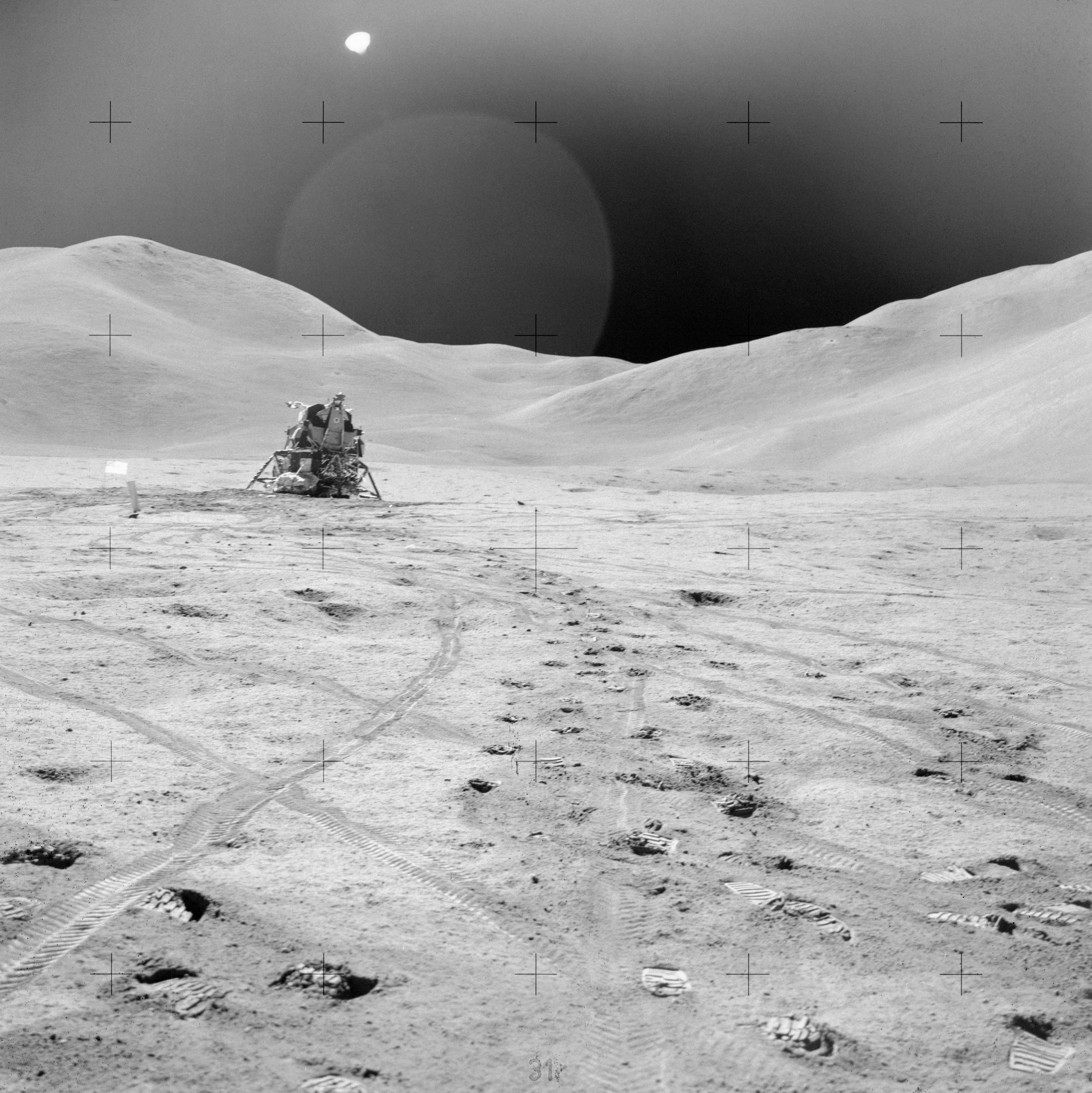
Falcon on the Moon. Note the slant of the vehicle

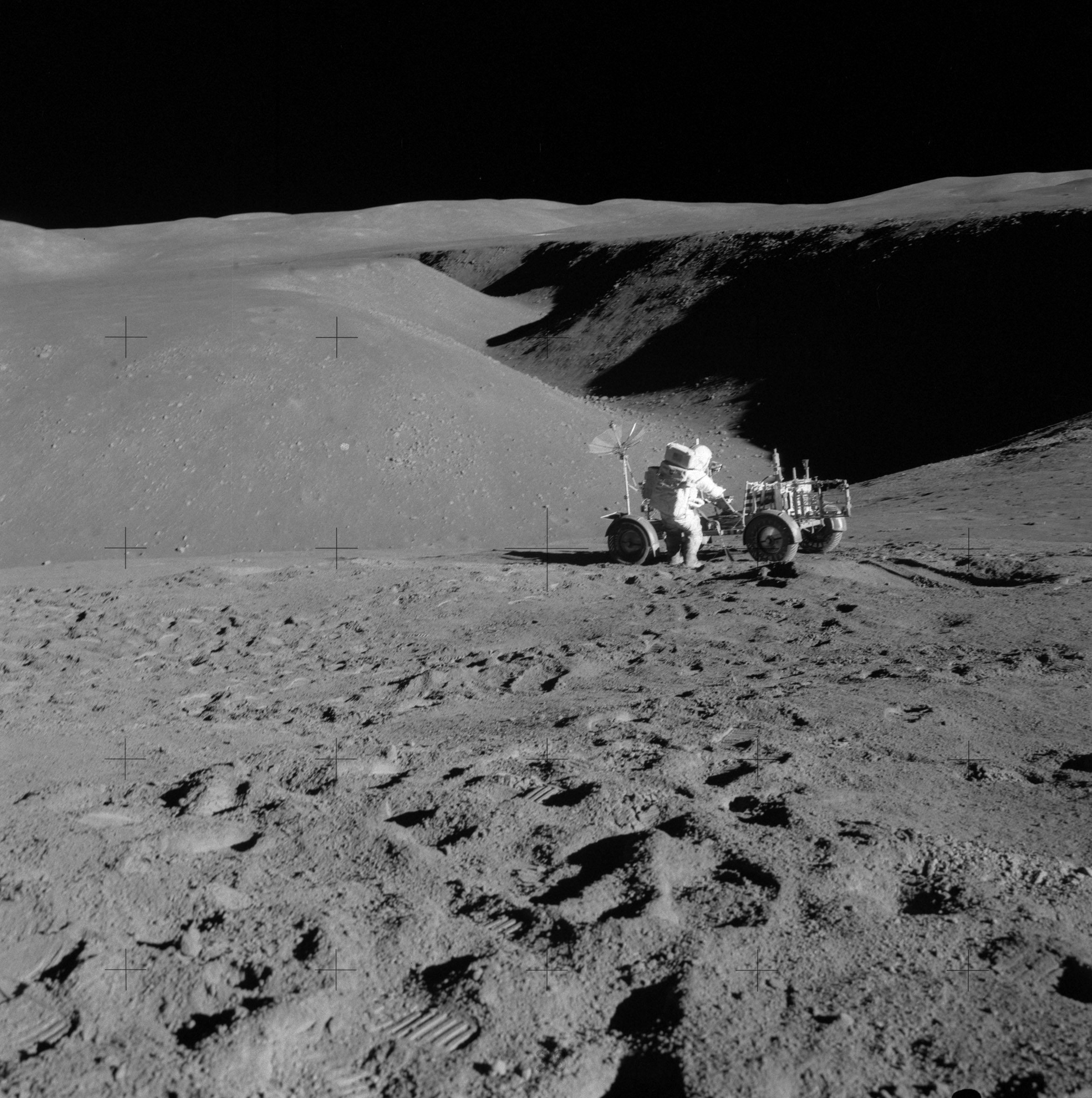
Scott does geology work near Hadley Rille

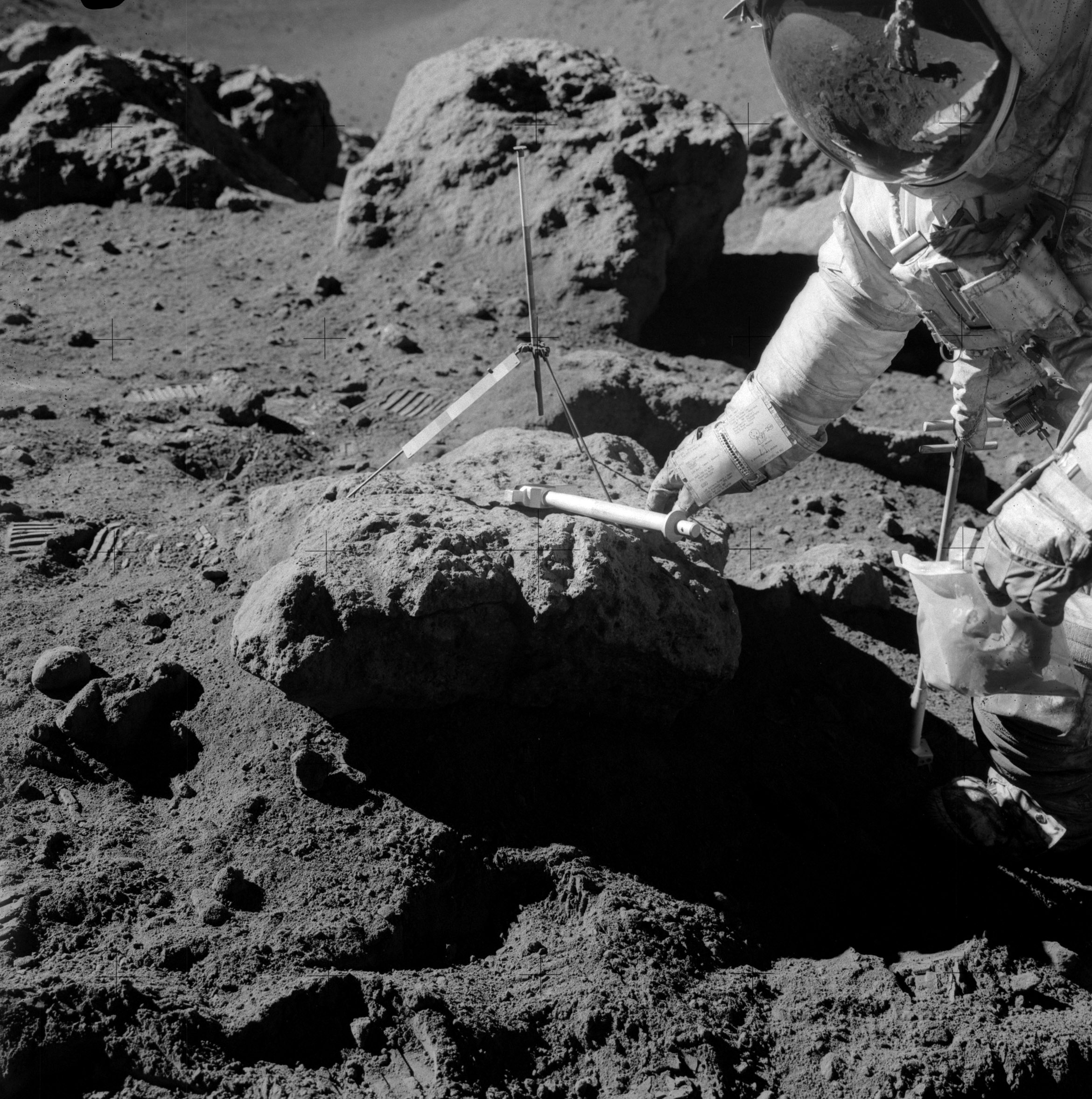
Scott examines a boulder during the third EVA

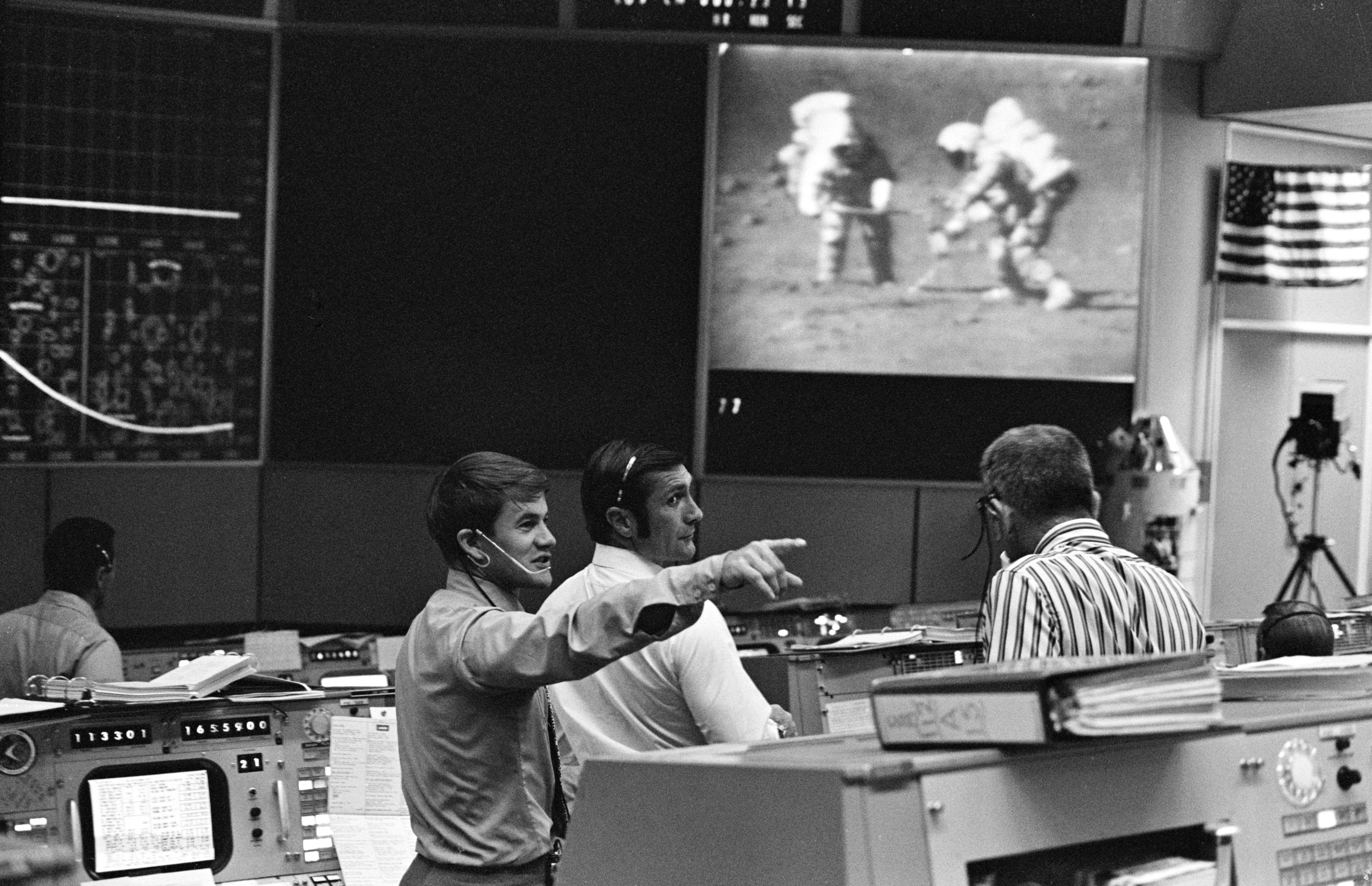
Mission Control in Houston during the third Apollo 15 EVA, August 2, 1971. CAPCOM Joe Allen is to left (pointing) with Dick Gordon next to him.

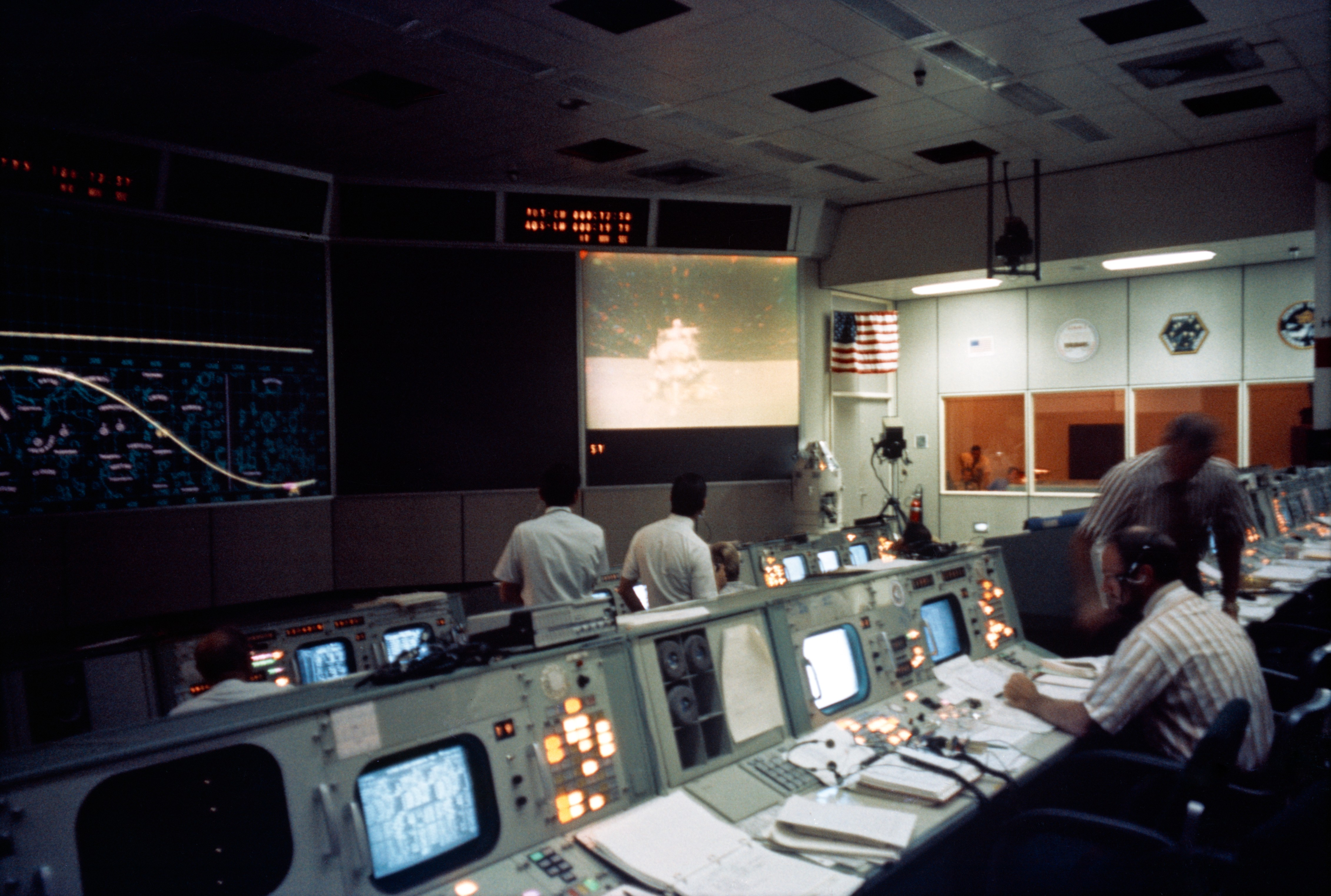
Mission Control in Houston as Falcon takes off from the Moon

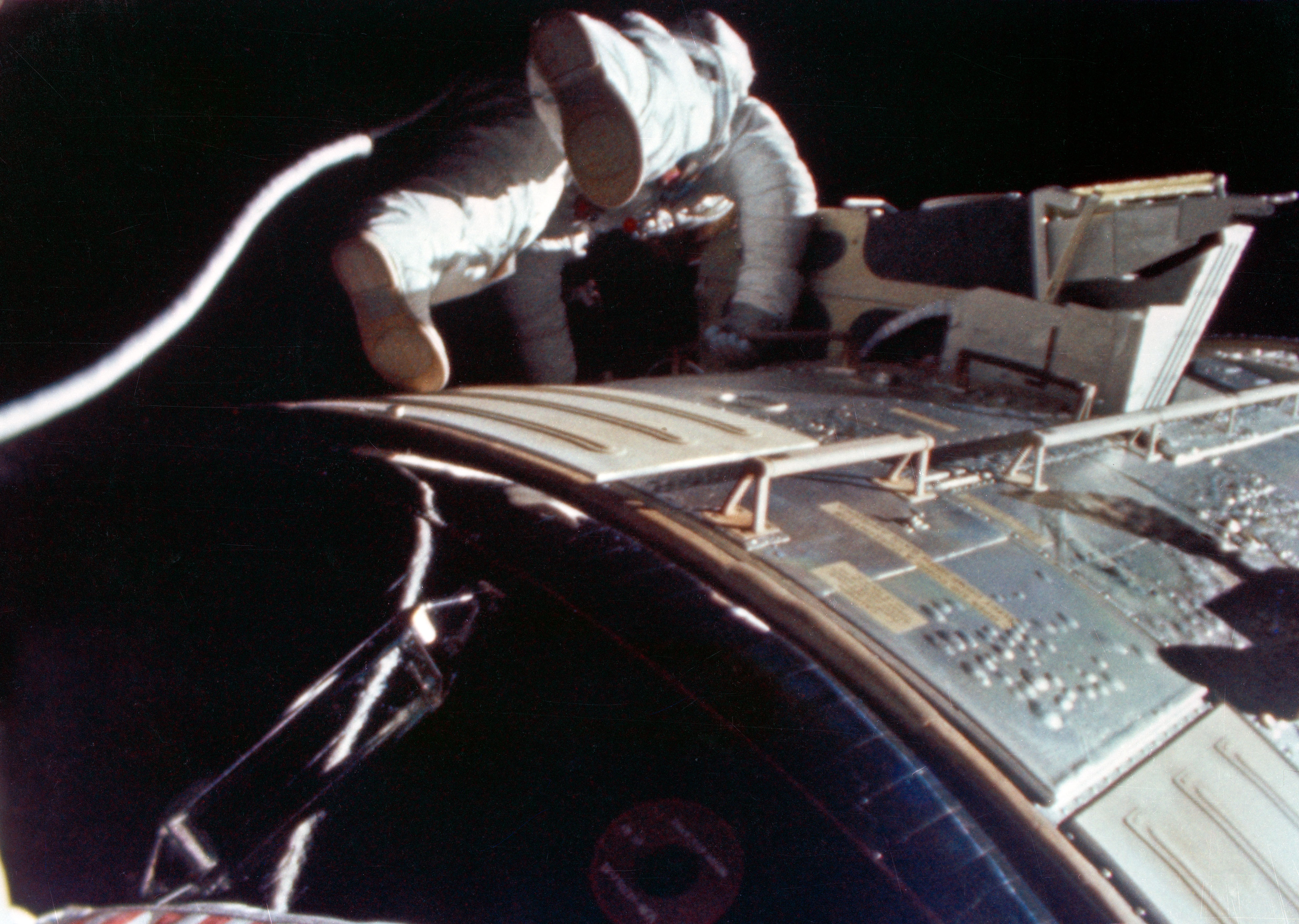
Alfred Worden in space suit retrieving film cartridges during the transearth coast

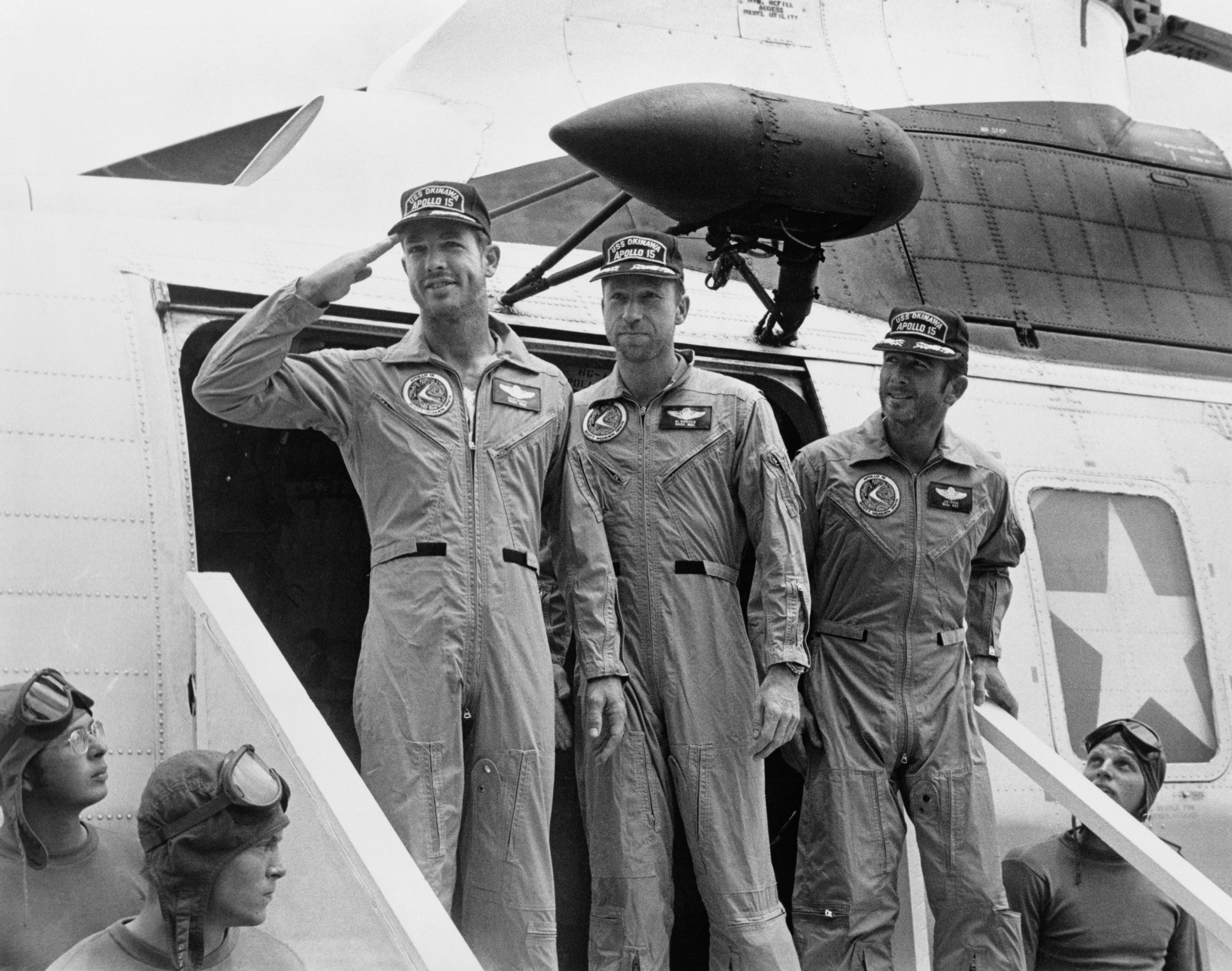
The astronauts disembark their helicopter aboard the Okinawa

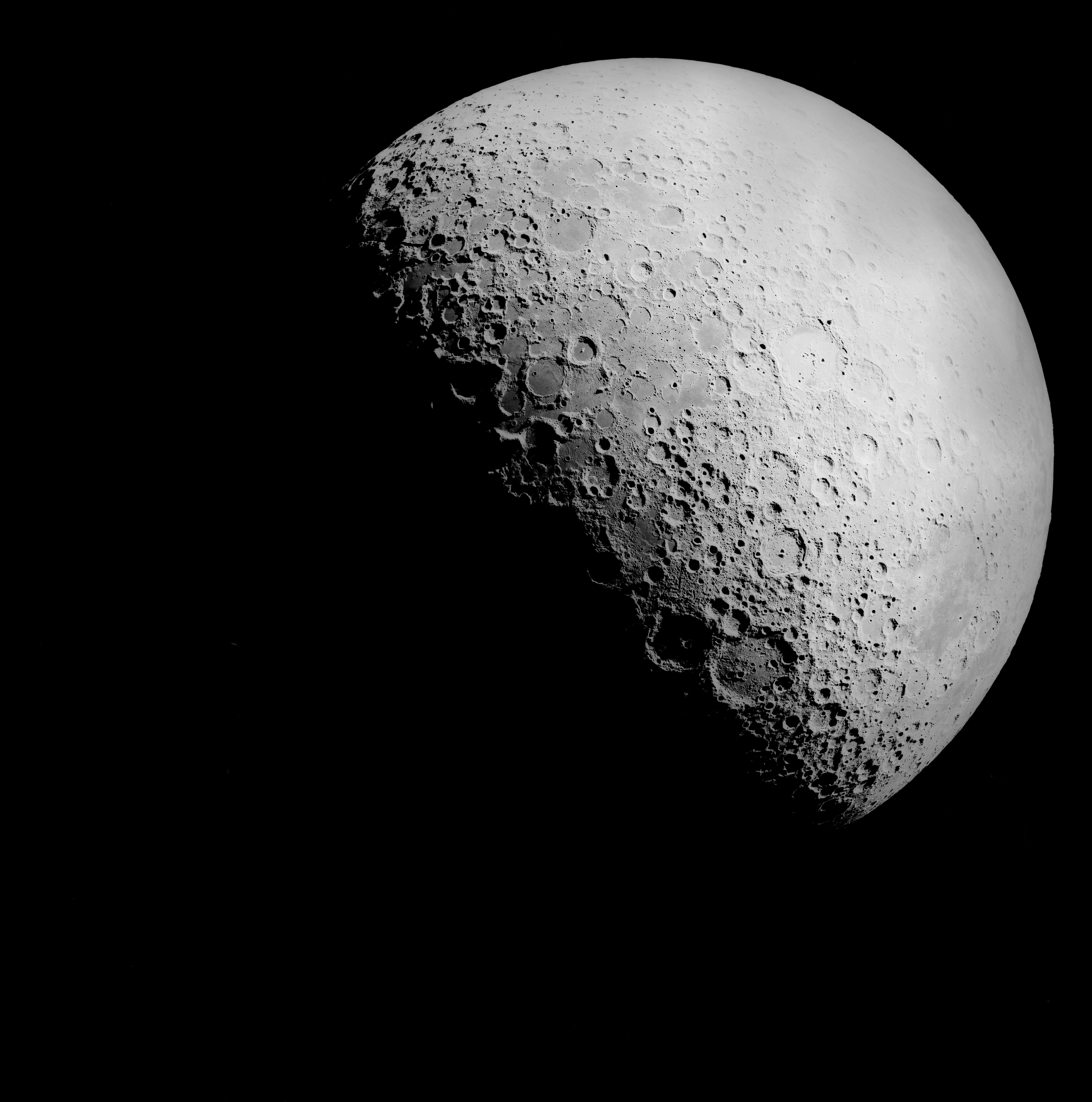
The Moon as seen from the departing Apollo 15 spacecraft

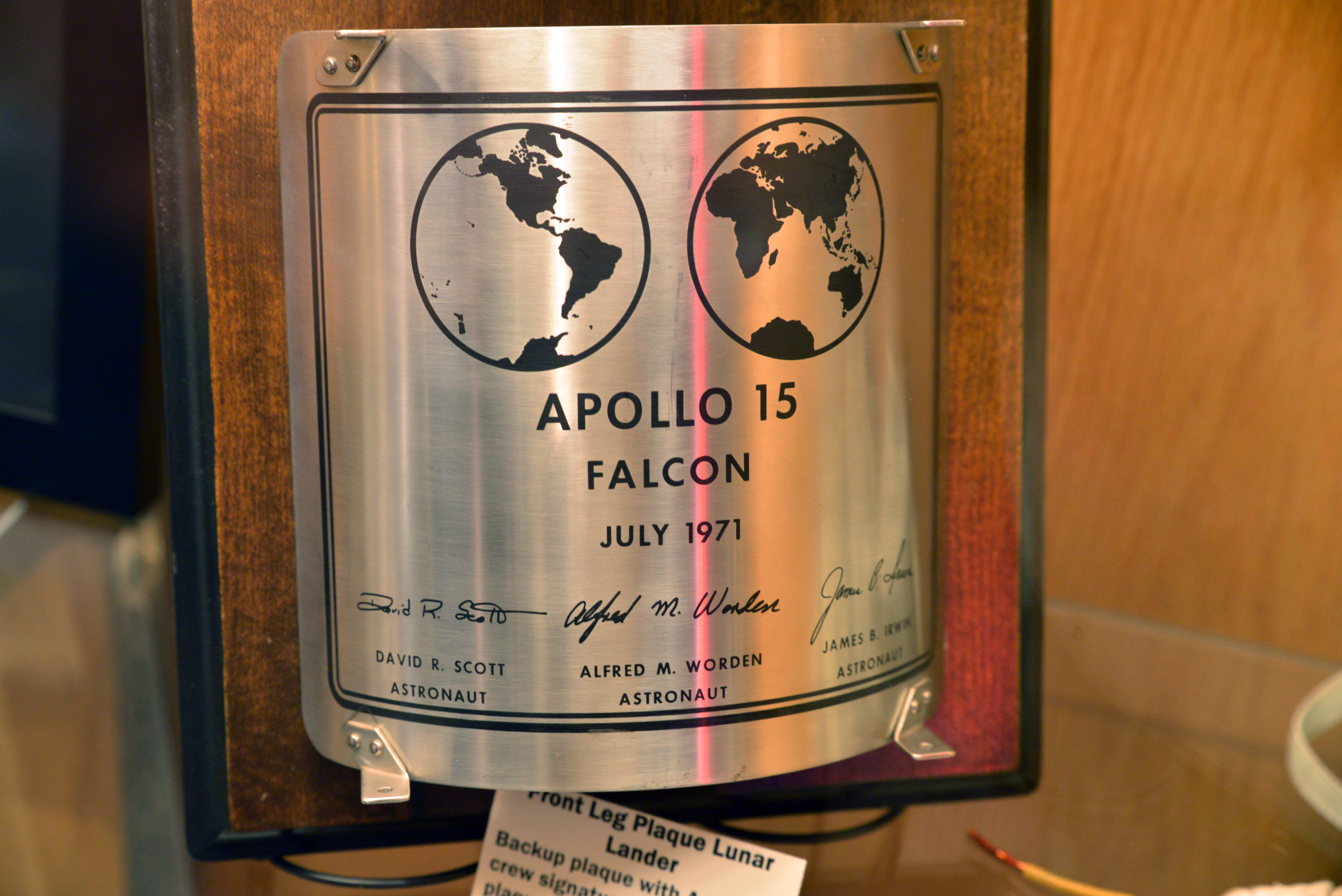
Backup of the plaque left on Falcon's descent stage

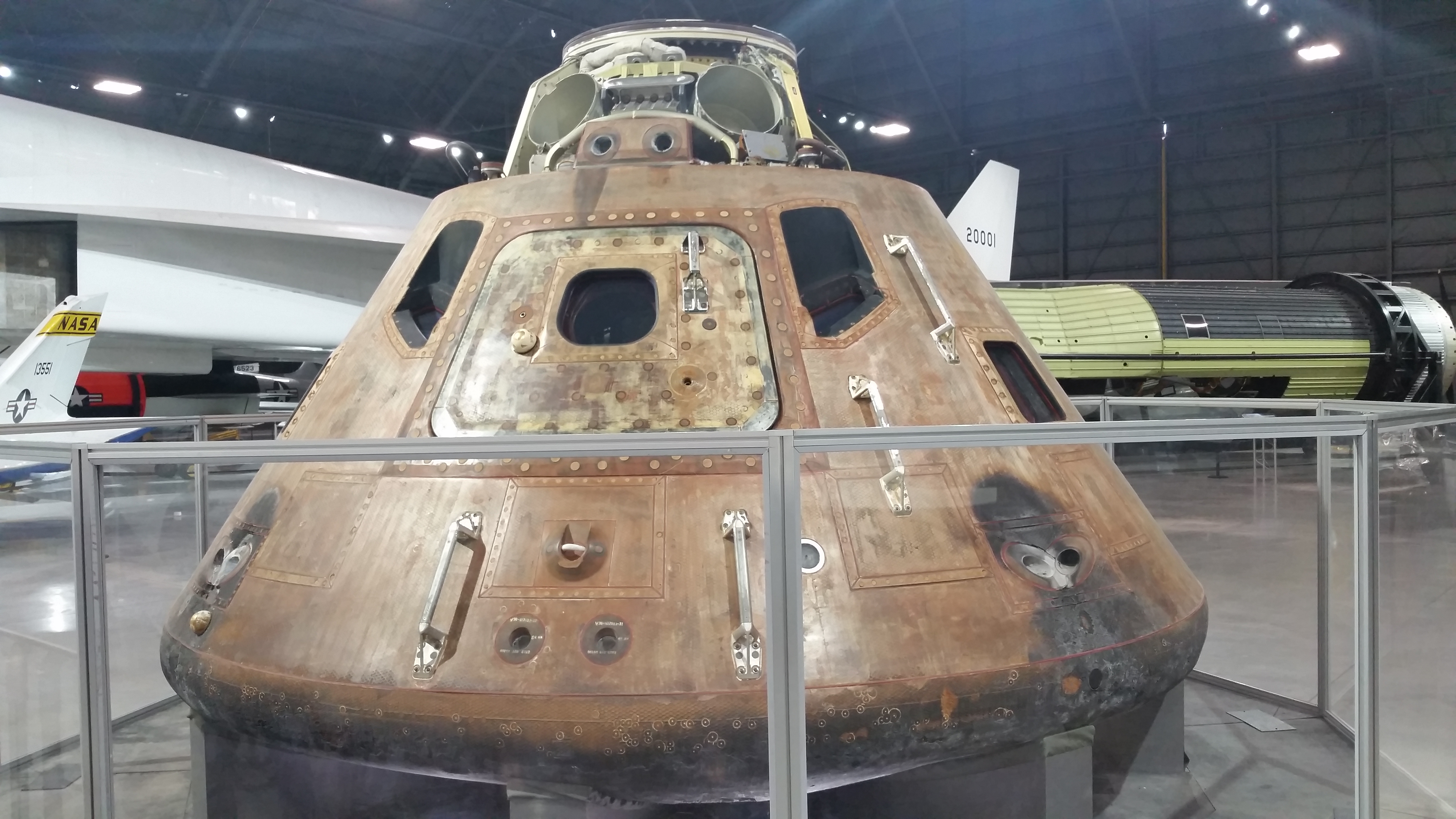
Command Module Endeavour on display at the National Museum of the United States Air Force in Dayton, Ohio

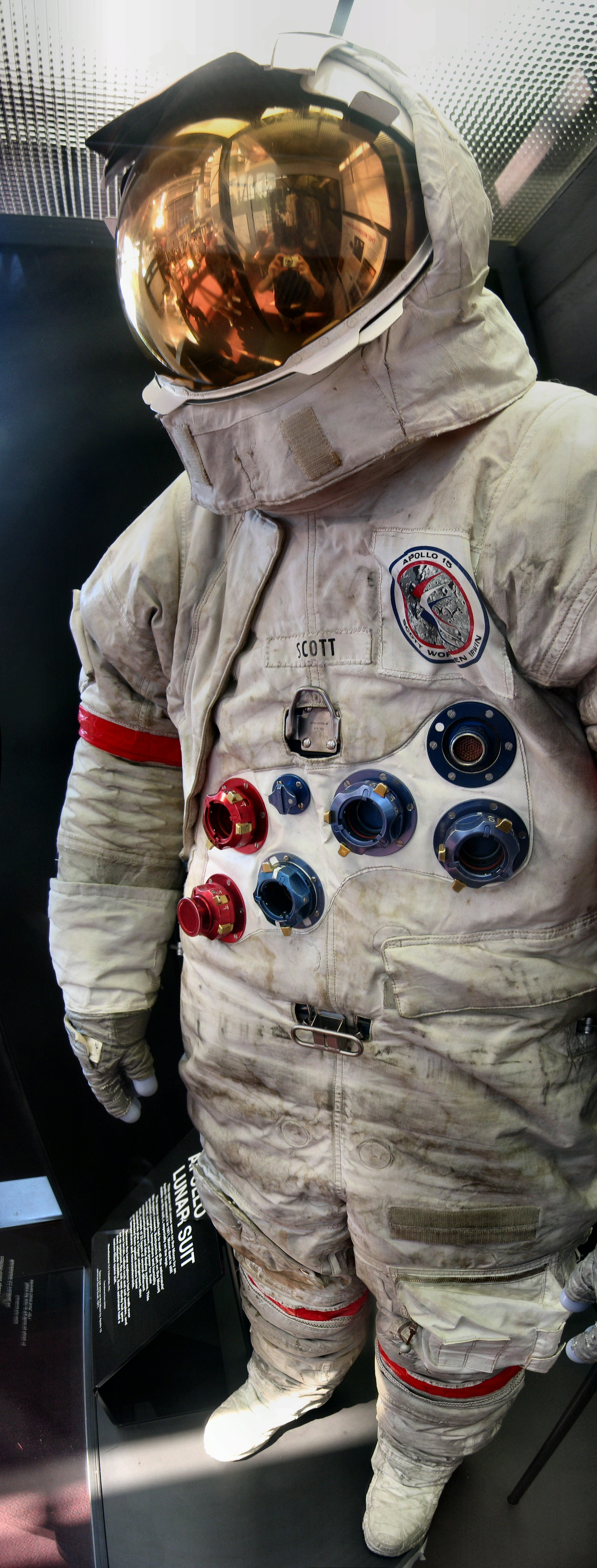
The spacesuit David Scott wore during the Apollo 15 mission is on display at the National Air and Space Museum, Washington, D.C.

=== Multimedia ===
Endeavour filmed from Falcon after undocking

Deployment of the lunar rover on the Moon

Liftoff from the Moon, seen through the LMP's window as Scott and Irwin play a prerecorded instrumental version of the song "The U.S. Air Force", commonly known as "Wild Blue Yonder".

Apollo 15 splashdown

== See also ==
- List of artificial objects on the Moon
- List of missions to the Moon
- List of spacewalks and moonwalks 1965–1999

== Bibliography ==
- Beattie, Donald A. (2001). Taking Science to the Moon. Baltimore, MD: The Johns Hopkins University Press. ISBN 978-0-8018-7440-6.
- Chaikin, Andrew (1994). A Man on the Moon: The Voyages of the Apollo Astronauts. New York: Viking. ISBN 978-0-670-81446-6. LCCN 93048680.
- Compton, William D. (1989). Where No Man Has Gone Before: A History of Apollo Lunar Exploration Missions. Washington, D.C.: U.S. Government Printing Office. OCLC 1045558568. SP-4214.
- Harland, David M. (1999). Exploring the Moon: The Apollo Expeditions. Chichester, UK: Springer-Praxis. ISBN 978-1-85233-099-6.
- Irwin, James B.; Emerson, William A. Jr. (1973). To Rule the Night: The Discovery Voyage of Astronaut Jim Irwin (1st ed.). Philadelphia: A. J. Holman Co. ISBN 978-0-87981-024-5. LCCN 73011410.
- Lindsay, Hamish (2001). Tracking Apollo to the Moon. London: Springer-Verlag. ISBN 978-1-85233-212-9.
- Apollo 15 Mission Report (PDF). Houston: NASA. 1971. OCLC 35233631. Archived (PDF) from the original on October 9, 2022.
- Orloff, Richard W. (2004) [2000]. Apollo by the Numbers: A Statistical Reference. NASA History Series. Washington, D.C.: NASA. ISBN 978-0-16-050631-4.
- Orloff, Richard W.; Harland, David M. (2006). Apollo: The Definitive Sourcebook. Chichester, UK: Praxis Publishing Company. ISBN 978-0-387-30043-6.
- Ramkissoon, Reuben A. (2006), "An Astrophilatelic Rendering of the Conquest of Space: Part 3, Project Apollo – the Moon Landing Missions", The Congress Book 2006, State College, PA: American Philatelic Congress, Inc., pp. 191–211
- Reynolds, David West (2002). Apollo: The Epic Journey to the Moon, 1963–1972. San Diego, CA: Tehabi Books Ltd. ISBN 978-0-7603-4452-1.
- Scott, David; Leonov, Alexei (2004). Two Sides of the Moon: Our Story of the Cold War Space Race. New York: Thomas Dunne Books. ISBN 978-0-7434-5067-6.
- Slayton, Deke; Cassutt, Michael (2011) [1994]. Deke! (First E-book ed.). New York: Forge. ISBN 978-1-466-80214-8.
- United States Senate Committee on Aeronautics and Space Sciences (August 3, 1972). "Commercialization of Items Carried by Astronauts". United States Senate.
- Van den Bussche, Willy (1980). Paul van Hoeydonck. Tielt, Belgium: Lannoo. ISBN 978-90-209-0885-5.
- Winick, Les (1973). "The Apollo 15 Cover Story". COMPEX: 71–89.
- Worden, Al; French, Francis (2011). Falling to Earth: An Apollo 15 Astronaut's Journey. Washington, D.C.: Smithsonian Books. ISBN 978-1-58834-309-3. LCCN 2011003440.
