= Apollo 15 operations on the Lunar surface =

Proceedings of NASA's fourth manned Moon landing until ascent

Apollo 15 lunar surface operations were conducted from July 30 to August 2, 1971, by Apollo 15 Commander David Scott and Apollo Lunar Module Pilot James Irwin, who used the first Lunar Roving Vehicle to make three exploratory trips away from their landing site at the base of the Apennine Mountains, near Hadley Rille.

They collected a total of 77 kg (170 lb) of lunar surface material during 18½ hours outside the Lunar Module Falcon.

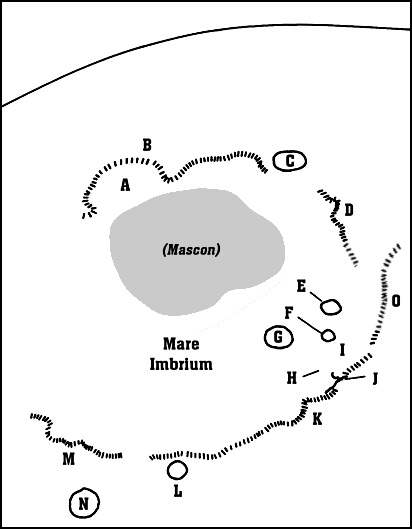
Map of Mare Imbrium. The Apollo 15 landing site is marked "J".

== Landing ==
At 104 hours, 30 minutes and 12 seconds GET the descent engine of Falcon ignited. Burning at about 10% for the first 26 seconds so that the guidance computer could gimbal the engine to direct the thrust through the center of gravity of the LM, it then thrust up to 100%. Irwin confirmed that the Abort Guidance System (AGS) agreed with the Primary Guidance and Navigation System (PGNS) on their height and rate of descent.

At three minutes the computer rolled the spacecraft so that they were now on their back, with the windows facing away from the lunar surface. This was so the landing radar could acquire the surface. Scott then announced the altitude and velocity lights, indicating the computer was getting acceptable data from the radar. Six minutes into the burn they were 30,000 feet (9000 m) above the surface.

In Mission Control, the Flight Director learned that tracking data indicated they were going to land 3000 feet (900 m) south of the targeted landing site. Although at first he decided not to tell the crew, Ed Mitchell, the CapCom, convinced him otherwise. During this time Scott was trying to see the ground through his window. He thought they were going to land as long as he could see Mount Hadley Delta. He was unable to see the Rille, something that had been possible in the simulators.

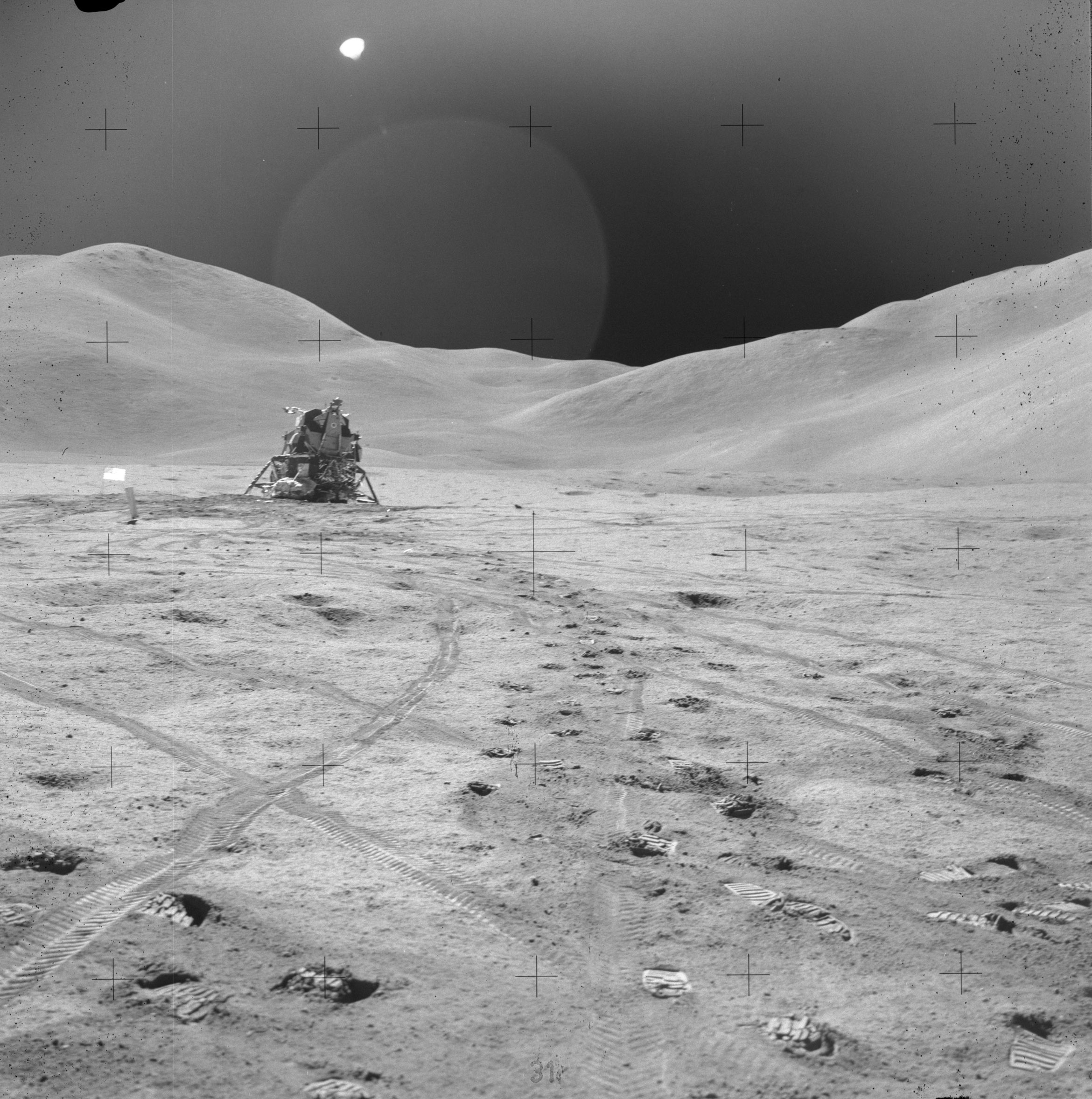
Falcon on the Plain at Hadley. Irwin took this photo from the ALSEP at the start of the third EVA. It shows the decided lean of the LM.

Nine minutes and ten seconds into the burn, Program 64 started on the computer and the LM pitched forward and the crew could see the ground. Using scribe marks on the window and angles read to him by Irwin, Scott found where the computer was predicting the landing site to be and then used a hand controller to move the predicted location. He did this 18 times during the landing, moving the target site a total of 338 meters (1110 feet) uprange and 409 meters (1341 feet) north.

Scott's main problem was that there was very little detail on the surface. The best images of the site only had 66 ft (20 m) resolution and photoanalysers had overenhanced the images. The main problem was overestimating the depth of craters, so as to make them have shadows at higher sun angles. Fortunately he was able to see four craters, Matthew, Mark, Luke and Index (the reason it was called Index and not John was due to Madalyn Murray O'Hair, an outspoken atheist who had sued NASA over the reading of Genesis during Apollo 8. Although she lost the case, NASA remained squeamish on overtly religious announcements on later flights).

Irwin began reading the altitude, rate of descent and the projected landing site. At 400 ft (120 m), the computer was switched to Program 66, designed for the landing phase. From now on Scott was flying manually. Irwin stopped reading out the projected landing site. Passing through 120 ft (37 m) Scott said he was picking up some dust. By the time they got to between 60 and 50 ft (18 to 15 m) the view outside would be completely obscured by dust.

Irwin then announced that the contact light had illuminated, indicating one of the landing probes on the LM's feet had contacted the ground. Immediately Scott cut the engine. With the extended engine bell there was a fear that it could touch the ground and cause exhaust to travel back into the engine. It is estimated that they were travelling 6.8 ft/s (2 m/s) when they hit, twice as fast as previous missions. A few seconds later, Scott informed the ground that "Okay, Houston. The Falcon is on the Plain at Hadley." Falcon was tilted nearly 10 degrees to its back left, just 5° below the maximum acceptable angle. It set down on the rim of a crater such that its engine bell was damaged, and with one of the legs in the crater. They were about 600 meters north and about 175 meters west of the targeted landing site. This was of little concern though thanks to the capabilities of the rover.

== Stand-up EVA ==
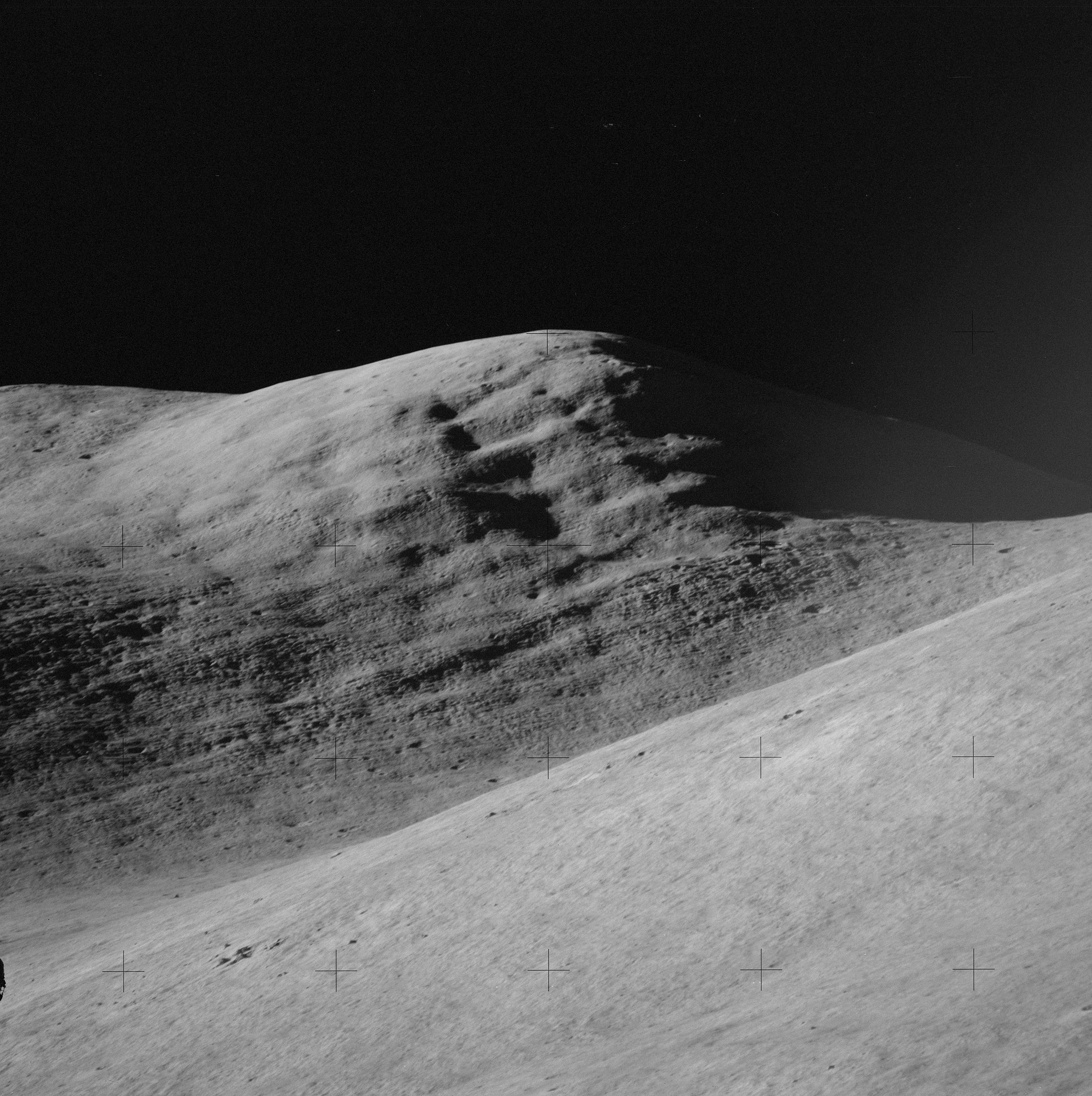
Silver Spur as seen by a telephoto image. It was named after Leon Silver.

Before they ventured outside for the first time, Scott and Irwin would sleep. Both had realized that in order to be at their best for their seven-hour Extra-vehicular activity they would need to be rested. But Scott had also learned the need to get an overview of a new survey site before venturing outside. As such he convinced mission planners to let them conduct a stand-up EVA before the first sleep period. It also gave them a stable platform to use a 500 mm telephoto lens that was carried on this mission for the first time. The lens had been a struggle to get on board a spacecraft where weight savings were measured in pounds.

Two hours after landing, they depressurized the LM and removed the top hatch and docking mechanism. Then, Scott stood on top of the ascent engine cover and put his head outside. Looking around, Scott was familiar with the territory having spent months studying maps of the area. He could easily recognize Mons Hadley, Mons Hadley Delta, the Swan Range, the Silver Spur, Bennett Hill, Hill 305, and the North Complex.

Scott's first task was to take a 22-picture stereo panorama of the area using a 60 mm lens. Then he photographed targets of interest with the telephoto lens, and then a color panorama of the area with the 60 mm lens.

He was able to put to bed any further concerns about the use of the Rover. Radar observations from Earth had given the impression that the area was covered in large boulders that would make it impossible to traverse with the Rover. Scott saw that there was nothing bigger than 6 to 8 inches (15 to 20 cm) near them. He then described the features he could see around him. Basically this was to give a general setting of the area and make sure there were no great surprises. Thirty minutes after opening the hatch, Scott re-entered and the hatch was closed and Falcon repressurized.

== EVA-1 ==
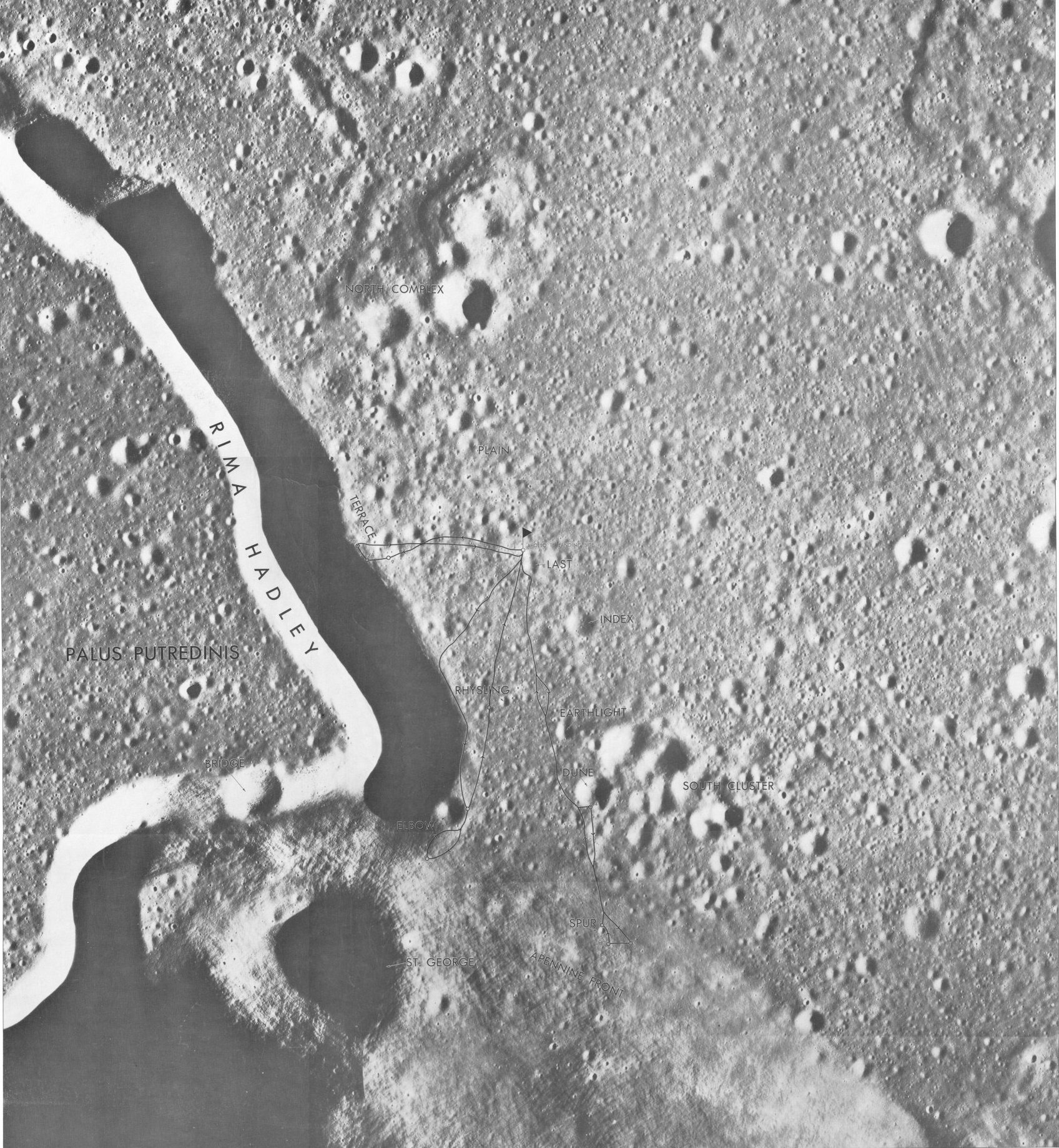
The traverses undertaken by Dave Scott and Jim Irwin during Apollo 15.

Throughout the astronauts' sleep period, Mission Control had watched with some concern as the pressure inside descent stage oxygen tanks of the LM slowly dropped. To conserve power during the night, the LM was run on a low-data-rate telemetry stream, so Mission Control could not tell the exact cause. Unwilling to wake the crew they decided to wait until they had woken up.

In the end, Flight Director Peter Frank chose to wake the crewmen an hour early and got them to turn back on the high-data-rate telemetry. With this they saw that the valve of the Urine Transfer Device was open even though the receptacle was capped. A total of about 8 out of 95 pounds (3.6 out of 43 kg) of oxygen had been lost. About half of the total amount was reserve. Scott and Irwin would state in the post-flight Technical Debrief that Mission Control should have awakened them as soon as the leak was detected.

Once they were awake, it was decided to start their preparations for the first lunar EVA of their mission. As with everything in Apollo, it was an involved procedure. Not only did they have to prepare Falcon, but had to don their space suits. Apollo 15 was the first crew that got to sleep in long johns rather than having to stay in their space suits. It would not be until four hours after waking up that Mission Control gave the Go to depressurize the LM.

As Scott became the seventh man to step onto the lunar surface, he said:

As I stand out here in the wonders of the unknown at Hadley, I sort of realize there's a fundamental truth to our nature. Man must explore. And this is exploration at its greatest.

After inspecting the LM, Scott began to unpack the Modularised Equipment Stowage Assembly (MESA), which was attached to the side of the LM and carried the Apollo TV camera, sample bags, batteries, CO_{2} scrubbers for the space suits, and other equipment needed while the astronauts were outside the spacecraft. About seven minutes after Scott stepped outside Irwin was on the surface.

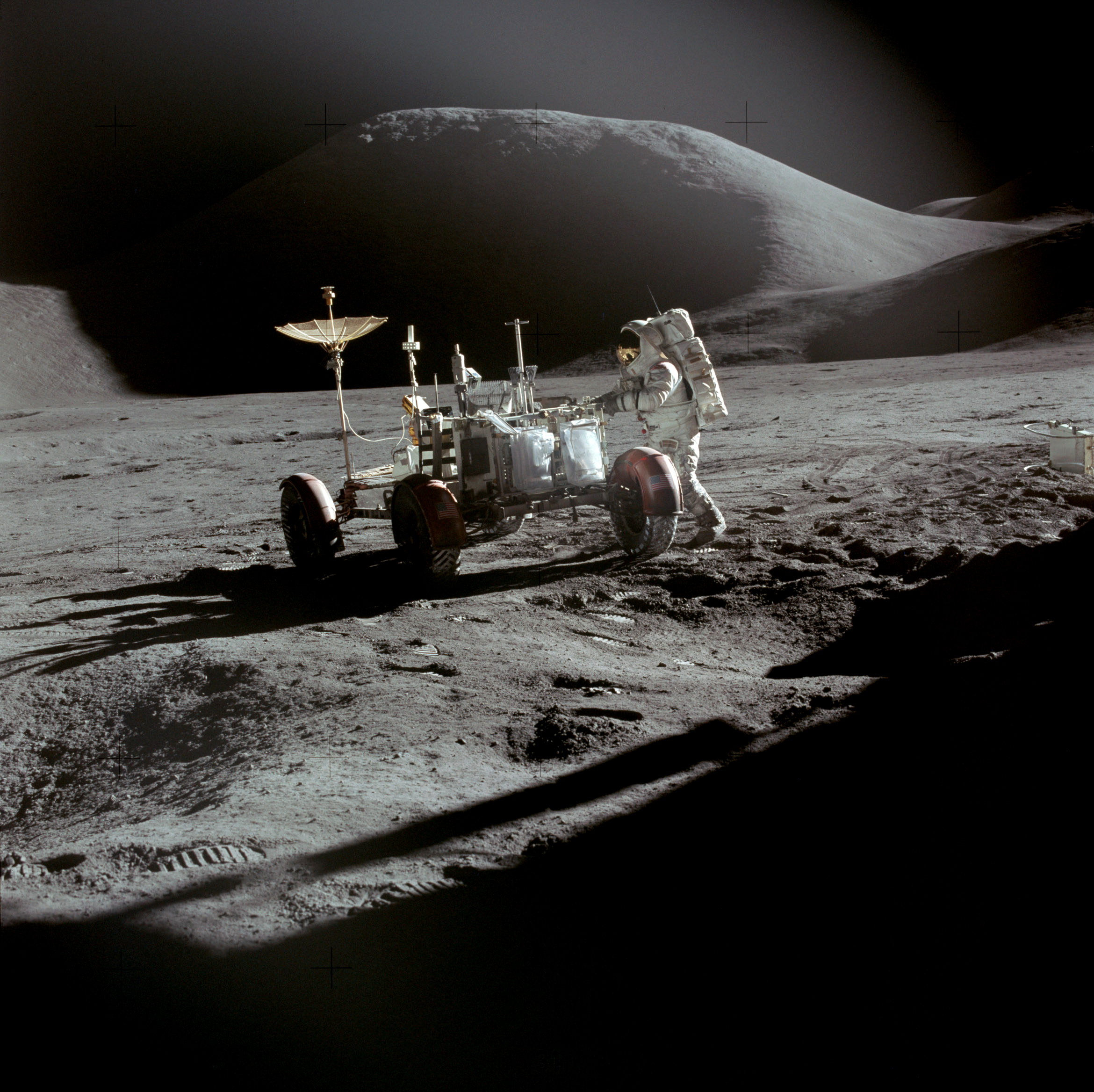
Irwin working at the Rover at the end of the first EVA

Irwin's first task was to collect a contingency sample of lunar rock. This was collected in case of an emergency, i.e., suddenly having to leave the lunar surface within the first few minutes. In such an event having a contingency sample meant that the crew would not return to Earth empty-handed. However, the contingency sample was not of much value because the ground surrounding the landing site had been disturbed by the LM descent engine.

After Scott positioned the TV camera on a tripod so Mission Control could see the deployment of the Lunar Rover, he and Irwin began the process by pulling on two lanyards. These released the Rover and let it swing down on hinges. As it did, it began to unfold. They experienced some problems at first due to the angle the LM was sitting on, but within minutes it was on the ground almost ready to go.

Scott had the honor of the first test drive, taking it around the LM. The Rover had both front and back steering, but Scott found that only the rear-wheel steering was working (mysteriously the front steering would be working at the start of the second EVA). Other difficulties came from how their space suits did not bend very much when they sat down. When training on Earth, their body weight had forced the suits down, but on the Moon, they ended up reclining in the seats. Also their bouncing up and down on the seats during the traverses (as a result of the rough terrain) resulted in the adding of seat belts for the LRV's on Apollos 16 and 17. Apart from the steering there were no other problems and the crew set about loading up the Rover for their first geological traverse. During lunar surface operations, Commander Scott always drove the rover, while Lunar Module Pilot Irwin was a passenger who assisted with navigation. This division of responsibilities between the two crew positions was used consistently throughout Apollo's J missions.

The astronauts could not travel any farther than the distance they could walk with the remaining oxygen in their Portable Life Support Systems (PLSS). So the earlier they set out, the farther they could travel. They would travel to the farthest point of the traverse and then work their way back. On EVA-1 they would travel to the base of Hadley Delta via the Rille. Their first target (Station 1) was the crater dubbed Elbow crater, so-called as it sat at a bend in the Rille. The first EVA also served an important task of working out exactly where they had landed. The Rover carried a navigation system that could calculate the distance and direction of a known starting point. By travelling to a known point this could be calibrated.

Scott set off at 9 km/h (6 mph), slow by terrestrial standards, but due to the lowness of the chassis of the Rover and the roughness of the surface, the astronauts would say it seemed quite quick. Throughout the journey, the astronauts had trouble identifying where they were. Due to not knowing exactly where the landing site was and over-enhanced maps, little was familiar. But the route chosen for this first drive had been picked with this in mind. By driving along the side of the rille it would be hard to miss their target.

After arriving at Elbow, Irwin's first task was to take a panorama of the site. At the same time Scott aligned the S-band antenna of the Rover with the Earth. This allowed Mission Control to operate the TV camera. Ed Fendell was in charge of controlling the camera and took his own pan so geologists in the backroom could see the site. The backroom kept track of everything that astronauts did on geology. As a sample was collected they would note its number, location and description on a card.

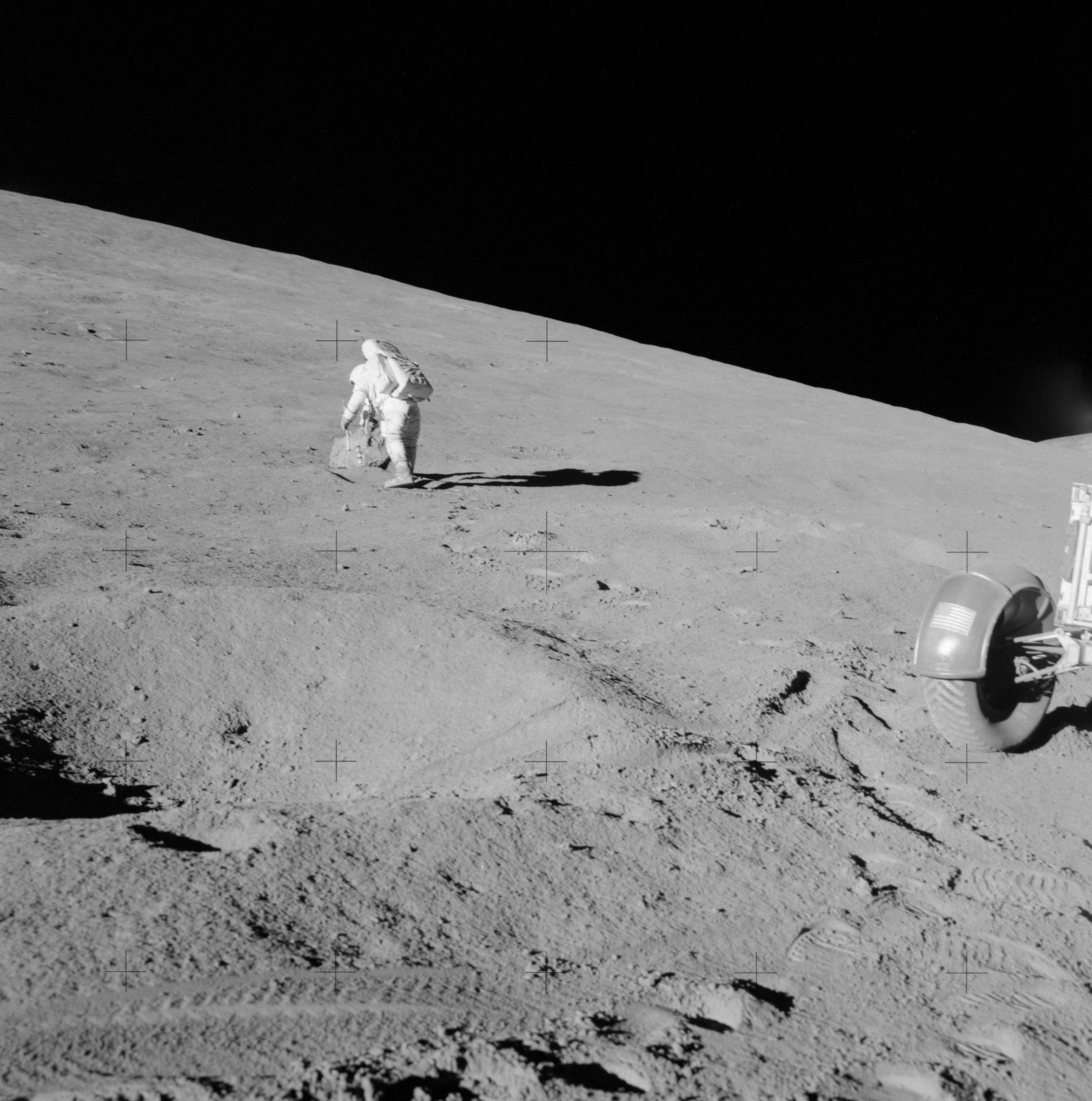
Dave Scott bent over the rock at Station 2. In the foreground is the 6-meter crater.

Scott and Irwin took a radial sample of the crater, taking samples at increasing distances in a straight line from the rim of the crater. After placing the photocalibration gnomon to the west of each sample, it was photographed, before being collected and placed into a numbered bag. Within ten minutes they had gathered four rock samples and it was time to move onto Station 2 — St George.

Five hundred meters south of Elbow was the 3 km wide St. George crater. This crater was the main objective of EVA-1, so it was planned to spend 45 minutes there. The flight plan had called for them to use the crater as a way of investigating the interior of Hadley Delta by collecting its ejecta. But as they approached they found there was no ejecta so it was decided not to bother visiting the rim of St George. Instead they travelled to a boulder sitting in the open by a 6-meter crater.

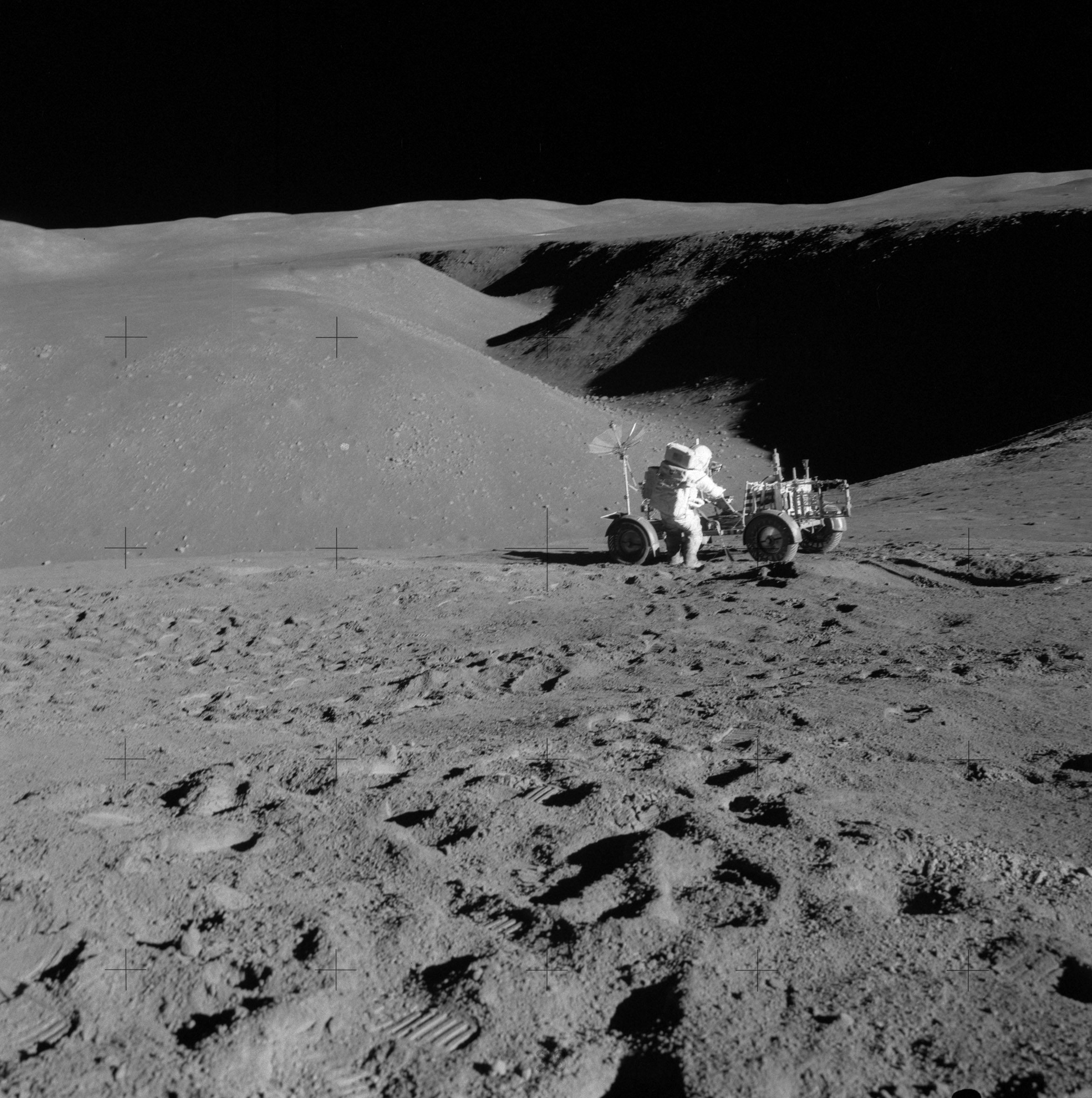
Taken at the double-core site by Irwin. It shows the view up the rille toward the northwest. Scott is at the Rover and the gnomon is on the ground at his right foot. Scan by Kipp Teague.

The rock they stopped at was about 5 feet (1.5 m) across. The larger a rock is, the more likely it was formed in the area, instead of being thrown there by an impact. Firstly they took a soil sample at the base of the rock, then another from a small depression down the hill a bit. Scott announced that after this they would roll the rock over and sample the soil from underneath it. After a couple of futile attempts they managed to chip some pieces off it. In A Man on the Moon, Andrew Chaikin writes that Dale Jackson of USGS was having dinner with some astronauts that night in Houston and happily proclaimed that "they did everything but fuck that rock." Other samples in the area were made using a specially designed rake with tines spaced 1 cm apart to collect small pebbles from the regolith. The last task at Station 2 was to take a core sample. This was done using a tube driven into the ground by a hammer.

Mission Control announced that it had decided to cancel a planned stop at a crater named Flow due to time constraints. Thus the astronauts boarded the Rover and drove back past Elbow and on their way to the LM. About 125 meters before a crater named Rhysling, Scott spied a large piece of vesicular basalt sitting by itself. Not wanting to just leave it there, he stopped the Rover. The stop was unplanned so he just told Mission Control his seatbelt had come loose, but quickly got off the Rover, ran over to the rock, using his collection tongs for a calibration in the photos, took a sample and got back to the Rover. During this time, Irwin distracted Mission Control by describing the surrounding craters. It was not until the sample boxes returned to Earth that the stop was discovered. The vesicular basalt is sample 15016, and it is sometimes called the seatbelt basalt.

Back at Falcon, Scott and Irwin set about deploying the Apollo Lunar Surface Experiments Package (ALSEP). Scott would drill the holes for the heat-flow experiment and put in the probes, while Irwin would set up the rest of the equipment. The ALSEP consisted of the passive seismic experiment, lunar surface magnetometer, solar wind spectrometer, suprathermal ion detector, cold cathode gauge experiment, lunar dust detector, and the heat-flow experiment. Not included in the ALSEP but deployed by Irwin as well were the Lunar Laser Ranging Experiment (LRRR) and the Solar Wind Composition Experiment. The ALSEP equipment was attached via cables to the Central Station powered by a radioisotope thermoelectric generator.

Scott had major trouble with the drilling. The first 40 cm were easy, but from then on it became more and more difficult. After 1.6 m, half of what was planned, he could get no further and Mission Control told him to just emplace the probes and start on the next hole. The extreme torque had locked the chuck meaning it had to be freed with a wrench, further delaying him. He could only get 1 meter into the ground on the second hole before Mission Control called it a day and told them to return to the LM.

They had been outside for 6½ hours. Returning to the LM gave the crew a much-needed rest. Irwin was dehydrated as his water bag had not worked, and he had gone over seven hours without liquids.

== EVA-2 ==
The target of the second EVA was Mount Hadley Delta again, but the crew drove via a more direct route and to a site east of where they had travelled the previous day. Travelling at 5.5 mph (9 km/h) they made good time across the plain. The first stop of the day, Station 4 was cancelled to give them more time to finish the drilling the holes for the heat flow experiment. This was at Dune crater, on the western edge of the South Cluster. The astronauts would, however, briefly visit Dune on the return trip to the LM.

After making a navigation stop, they started to travel the 1.9 mi (3 km) along the base of the Delta towards Dandelion and Frost craters; Frost was to be the location of Station 5. Scott found there was little variation in the surroundings and decided that Frost was going to offer little difference, so it was decided to stop at a site about 1.9 mi (3 km) from St George and 320 ft (100 m) up to the Delta. It was interesting work, with the slope being about 10 degrees. Not reaching Frost cancelled Station 5, placing them instead at Station 6.

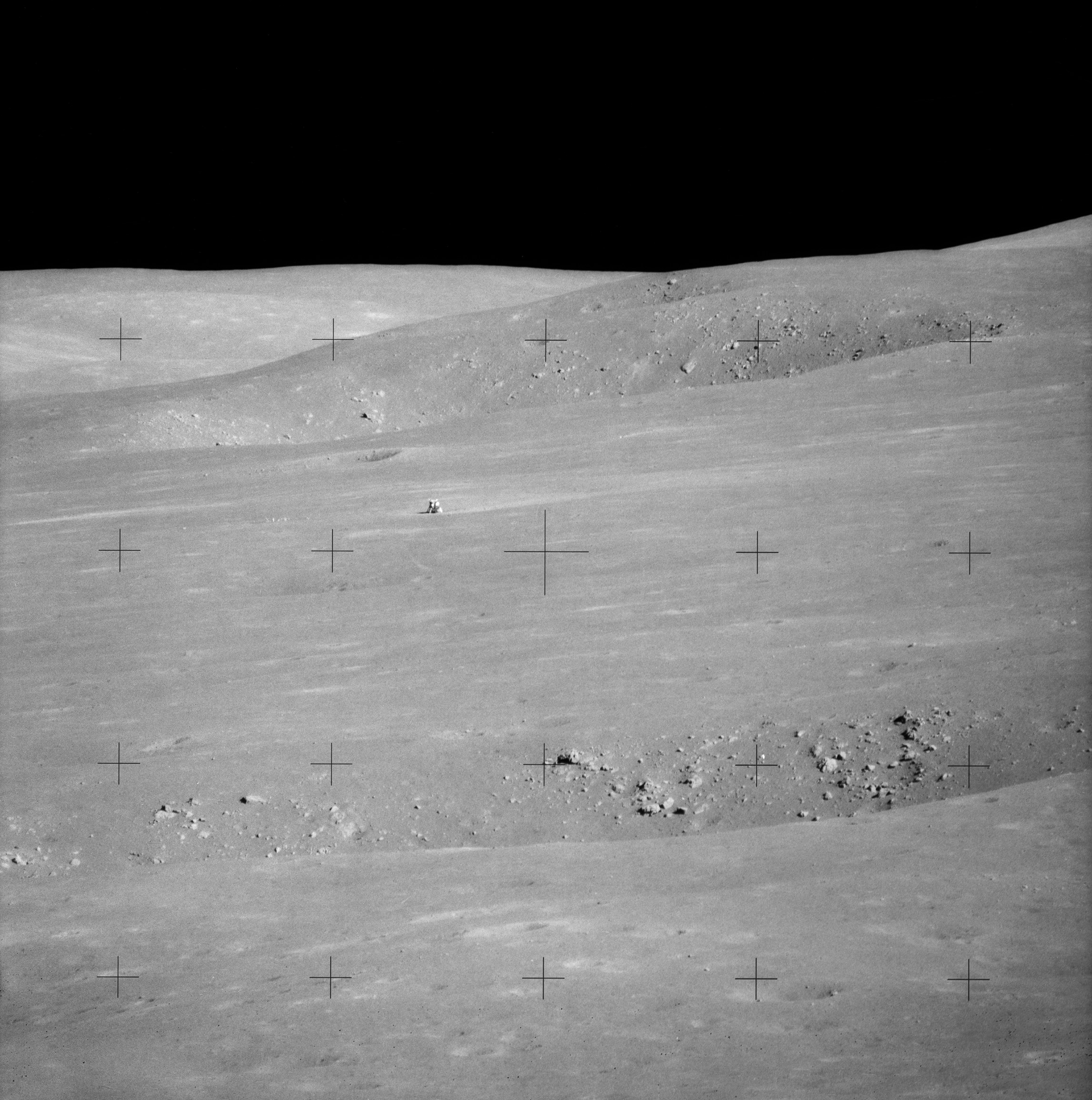
A 500 mm telephoto lens photograph of Falcon taken from Station 6 on EVA-2. To the LM's left is the ALSEP. Dune crater is in the foreground and the hills of the North Complex are beyond Falcon.

They first sampled a fresh-looking 1-meter crater, that was part of the rim of the older 3-meter crater. More samples were made above the area where they had parked the Rover. Most were breccias, but they did find one porphyritic basalt.

Scott decided to move down to a 40 ft (12 m) crater, which was the largest one nearby. He went down inside it to sample, but found most of the rocks to be too large. Mission Control called up and said they would like the crew to dig a trench to study the soil mechanics and take a core sample. Irwin dug the trench, which Scott photographed. Then the core sample (15009) was taken from inside the crater.

Returning to the Rover, they drove 650 ft (200 m) to a large boulder (Station 6A). Even walking short distances on the slope was time consuming so it was easier to just have the crew use the Rover to get there. The boulder was 10 ft (3 m) across. It was necessary for one crewmember to stay by the Rover, holding it to make sure it did not slide down the hill, which now had a 15-degree slope. With time running out on the stop, Scott was able to confirm what Irwin had seen earlier — the rock had a greenish tinge. The color was found to come from magnesium oxide.

Back on the Rover, they traveled onward to Spur crater (Station 7), which was 320 ft (100 m) across and 66 ft (20 m) deep. Reaching the crater's rim they found small fragments, including one with a white vein. At first Irwin thought he had kicked up some green soil, but Scott found it was just caused by the visors of the helmets which were coated gold.

Discovery of the Genesis Rock

It was then that they saw what would become the most famous lunar sample collected during the entire Apollo program — sample 15415 or as it was dubbed by the media, the "Genesis Rock". It looked at first just like a partially crystalline rock, but the closer they looked they realized it was almost pure plagioclase, meaning it was anorthosite. It was originally thought they had found a piece of the Moon's primordial crust, but later analysis would show that the rock was only 4.1 ± 0.1 billion years old, which is younger than the Moon itself, and was formed after the Moon's crust solidified. But it was still an extremely old sample, and was from the pre-Imbrian era.

Scott quickly went to a large boulder on the northwest rim of the crater and took photos of it from many angles. He collected a sample next to it (15445) which he assumed had broken off of it. The boulder was determined to be a large impact melt breccia. He then joined Irwin who was preparing to collect a rake sample closer to the rover.

With time running out, and the walk-back constraint approaching, the geology backroom decided that they wanted the astronauts to collect as many small fragments as they could from the area. Irwin had wanted to sample a large breccia but after spending so much time on #15415, there was little time left at the site. They also took some rake samples, netting 78 fragments from the regolith. With only three minutes before they had to move on, Irwin hit a large rock with his scoop, breaking it along one of its fracture lines. The chip they collected would be the second-largest rock collected on the mission.

They returned to Falcon along essentially the same path as they came. Passing the South Cluster and Dune, Scott decided to stop and collect some samples. Joe Allen, the CapCom, warned them that they only had ten minutes to spend here. Irwin's camera jammed after acquiring a panorama of the area, forcing Scott to take all the remaining documentation photography. Working quickly, they collected samples, including several from a large basalt boulder on the rim of Dune.

On returning to the LM, Scott began another attempt at drilling holes for the heat-flow experiment. Irwin took some manual core samples from around the ALSEP site. Again like the previous day the drill continued to get stuck, refusing to go any further. Scott was able to advance a few centimeters by pulling the drill up to clear the flutes on the drill bit and then letting the drill advance only using its own weight. This process however would cause the drill bit sections to come apart, meaning that what Scott was really doing was creating a new obstruction below the surface without realizing it. When he tried to emplace the probes they only went in 3 ft (1 m). Post-flight analysis would find that the drill design was flawed, with the flutes too close together at the joint joining the sections of the stem.

A soil mechanics experiment was undertaken by digging a trench and using a penetrometer to measure the strength of the regolith. Scott began drilling another hole, this time for a deep core sample. At 2.4 meters, Scott decided that this was far enough as they were well below the depth of the heat-flow probes, the main reason for taking the core sample. Not wanting to lose time the next day returning to remove the core, he started to pull it out. He managed to get it up 20 cm but then it refused to move any further.

The last task of the day was to set up the flag of the United States. They were outside Falcon for 7 hours and 12 minutes.

== EVA-3 ==
Overnight, Mission Control decided to cancel the traverse to the North Complex. Time saved not going there would be spent on pulling out the deep core sample. Although annoyed by this, Scott understood that although he was in command of the mission, he was part of a team, and the mission scientists had decided that the core sample was more important than sampling the North Complex.

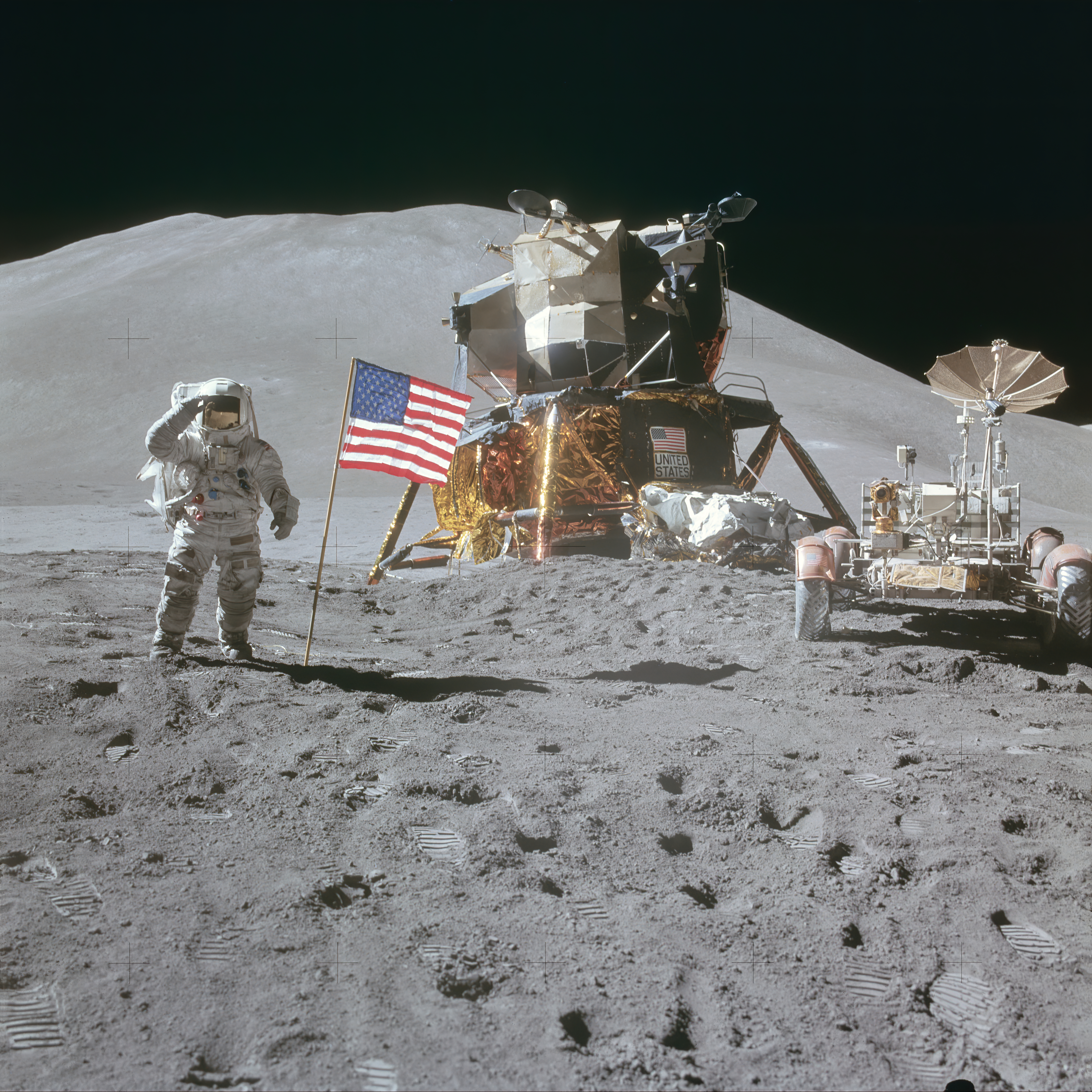
Jim Irwin salutes the US flag

Before setting off to the ALSEP site, the crew took some customary publicity shots of them and the flag.

Back at the core sample drill, both Scott and Irwin grabbed hold of the drill and tried to pull it out. Slowly but surely, they managed to work it out of the ground by getting up under the drill. A few more tries and it was completely out of the ground. When they came to break the stem apart they found that a vice built into the Rover for the purpose had been installed backwards. Scott by this time was becoming more and more annoyed at the amount of time being spent on this sample and said "How many hours do you want to spend on this drill, Joe?"

Analysis of the core samples found that pebble concentration and density varied dramatically. Along the 7.9 ft (2.4 m) length of the sample, there were more than 50 distinct layers, varying in thickness from 0.2 to 8.2 inches (0.5 to 21 cm). Of particular interest was that the deepest portions of the core samples were too deep for cosmic rays to penetrate, meaning that they had not been affected by recent cosmic ray activity.

The Rover TV camera was having problems. Any attempt to tilt up or down would cause it to flop down, leaving it pointing uselessly at the ground and requiring an astronaut to repoint it.

After making a 16 mm film of the Rover driving for the engineers on Earth, they set off for the main target of their last EVA, Hadley Rille. On the way, they stopped to photograph a rock they suspected had formed a crater nearby. There was no time to stop and sample it.

They arrived at a 50 ft (15 m) crater near to their original target crater, Scarp. Scott decided to stop there as it met the original objective of Scarp, which was to collect debris from near the rille. After taking a panorama of the site, Scott took some samples, finding them to be extremely soft. It is thought that the area around them was the youngest ever walked on by an astronaut.

Moving on, they traveled to the rille. One of the objectives of Apollo 15 was to sample exposed bedrock at its point of origin. On previous missions, the basalt collected had been thrown there by impacts. As Irwin took the site panorama, Scott used the 500 mm telephoto lens to image the far side of the Rille, which was about 0.6 mi (1 km) across. They were looking for layering in the wall of the Rille, which could help geologists to find if the lava flows that had filled Palus Putredinis came in one go or over time.

Irwin started a radial sample. He found a rectangular rock that was too large to return to Earth. Due to the slope of the surrounding area, he was able to see some bedrock below the rim of the Rille that appeared to be above them further along. They walked to a 10 ft (3 m) crater and sampled the meter-sized rocks that it had thrown up.

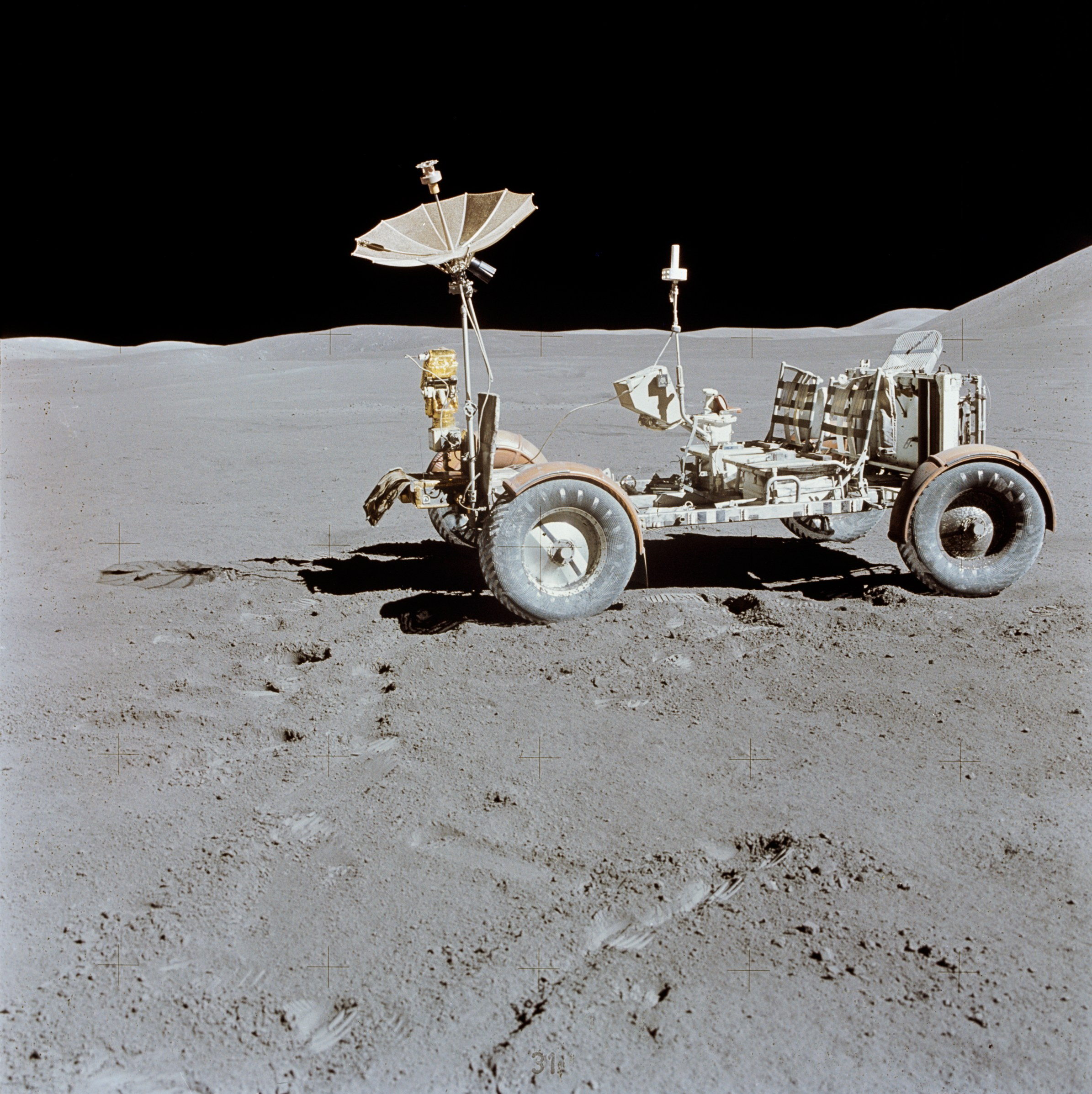
The Lunar Rover at the end of the last EVA of the mission in its final resting place

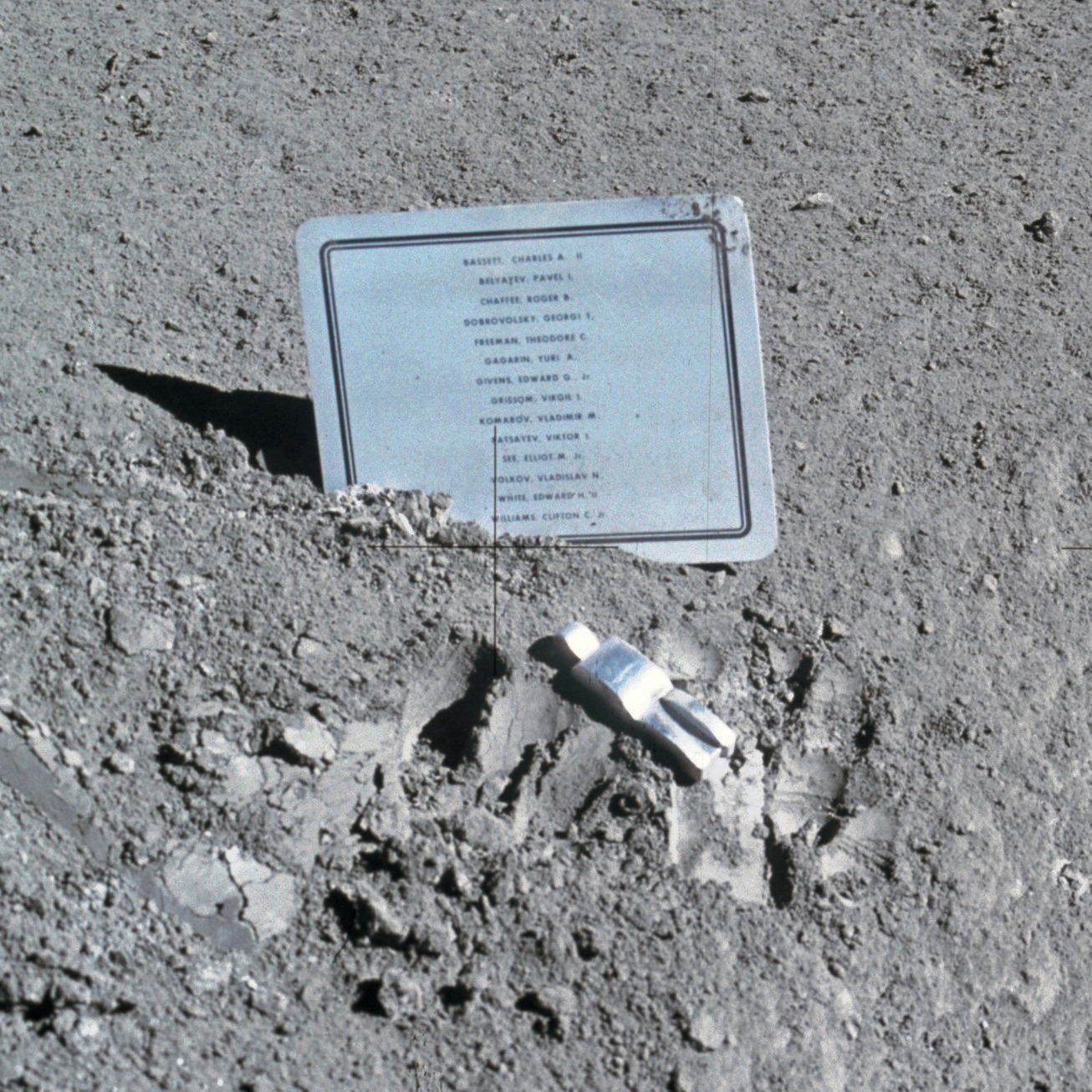
David Scott curated the Fallen Astronaut statue by Paul Van Hoeydonck, placing it 20 feet away from where he parked and left the Lunar Roving Vehicle

It was meant to be time to move on again, but the geology backroom decided that the loss of another sampling station was offset by the chance of sampling true bedrock, so they were given more time. Moving down to the very edge of the rille, they sampled a 7 ft (2 m) rock. Back at the Rover, they took another rake sample and a core sample. Scott then decided to sample a vuggy, coarsely grained basalt. He decided to take the whole football-shaped rock. Dubbed "Great Scott", the 21 lb (9.6 kg) sample would be the biggest returned on Apollo 15 (Sample 15555). They moved on to the last station of the mission, Station 10. With little time left, all they could do was photograph the site at a 200 ft (60 m) crater.

Scott had one more thing to do once he returned to the Lunar Module:

Well, in my left hand, I have a feather; in my right hand, a hammer. And I guess one of the reasons we got here today was because of a gentleman named Galileo, a long time ago, who made a rather significant discovery about falling objects in gravity fields. And we thought where would be a better place to confirm his findings than on the Moon? And so we thought we'd try it here for you. The feather happens to be, appropriately, a falcon feather for our Falcon. And I'll drop the two of them here and, hopefully, they'll hit the ground at the same time.

And they did. Later investigations found that the feather may have been extracted from the wing of a female gyrfalcon. Scott then drove the Rover for the last time to a point 300 ft (90 m) from the LM so that it could observe the liftoff. He placed a small Bible on the hand controller and then walked about 20 ft (6 m) to a small hollow where he placed a plaque bearing the names of the fourteen known astronauts and cosmonauts to have died (two cosmonaut deaths had not been made public at the time – Valentin Bondarenko and Grigori Nelyubov). Beside it he placed the Fallen Astronaut statuette.

They were outside the LM for 4 hours and 50 minutes.

== Planimetric Maps of Geology Stations ==
These are maps from the Apollo 15 Preliminary Science Report, edited slightly. In all figures, X indicates sample locations, 5-digit numbers are LRL sample numbers, rectangle is lunar rover (dot indicates TV camera), black spots are large rocks, dashed lines are crater rims or other topographic features, and triangles are panorama stations.

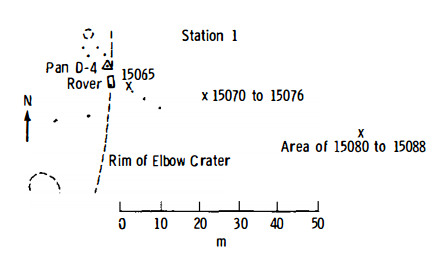
Station 1 (Elbow)

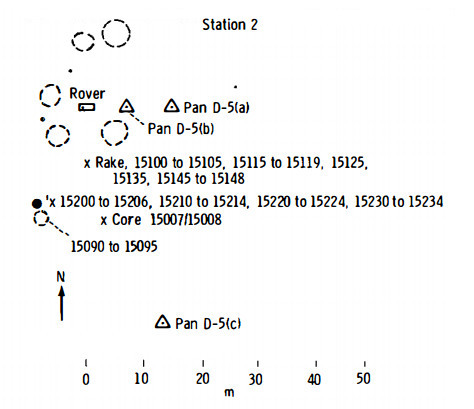
Station 2 (near St. George)

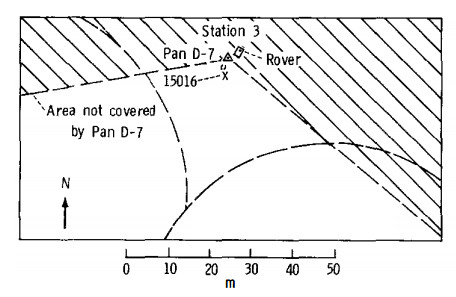
Station 3 (near Rhysling)

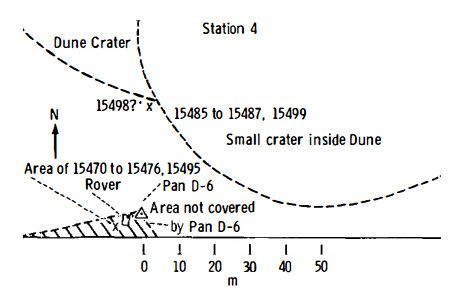
Station 4 (Dune)

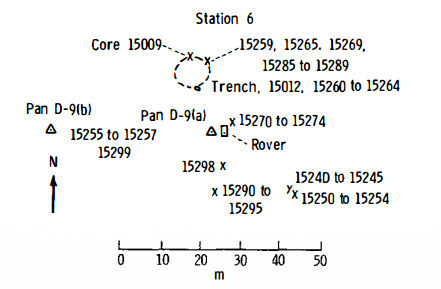
Station 6 (near Spur)

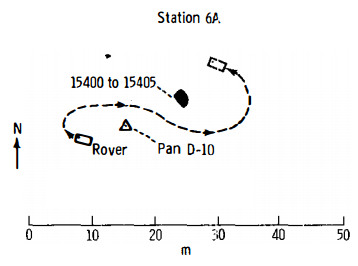
Station 6A (near Spur)

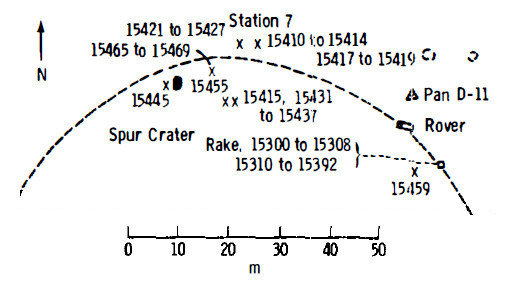
Station 7 (Spur)

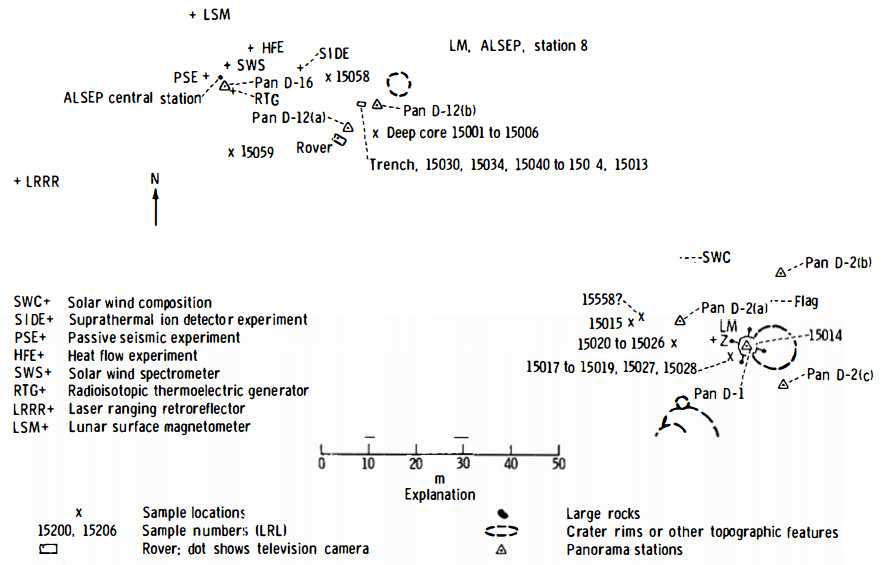
LM Falcon landing site/ALSEP/Station 8

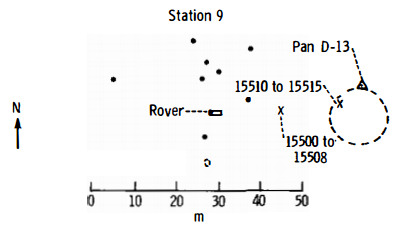
Station 9 (Hadley Rille)

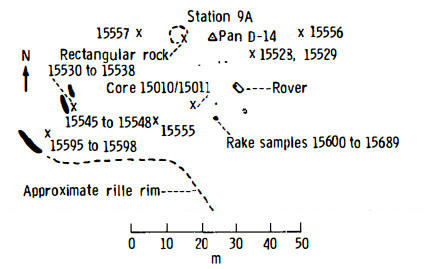
Station 9A (Hadley Rille)

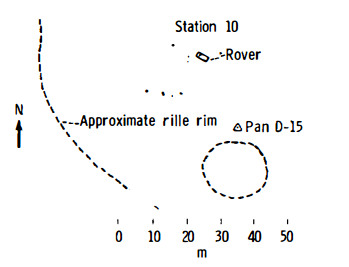
Station 10 (Hadley Rille)

== Media ==
The landing on the Moon at Hadley seen from the perspective of the Lunar Module Pilot. Starts at about 5000 feet

16 mm film sequence of driving the Lunar Rover

Scott demonstrates that Galileo was right

The liftoff from the Moon as seen by the TV camera on the Rover

The liftoff from the Moon as seen from the Lunar Module.
