= 3333 Schaber =

Main-belt asteroid

Discovery
- Discovered by: C. Shoemaker
- Discovery site: Palomar Obs.
- Discovery date: 9 October 1980

Designations
- Named after: Gerald Gene Schaber (American geologist)
- Alternative designations: 1980 TG_{5} · 1964 WR; 1975 XM_{2}
- Minor planet category: main-belt · (outer) background

Orbital characteristics
- Epoch 23 March 2018 (JD 2458200.5)
- Uncertainty parameter 0
- Observation arc: 52.42 yr (19,147 d)
- Aphelion: 3.8276 AU
- Perihelion: 2.4390 AU
- Semi-major axis: 3.1333 AU
- Eccentricity: 0.2216
- Orbital period (sidereal): 5.55 yr (2,026 d)
- Mean anomaly: 333.25°
- Mean motion: 0° 10^{m} 39.72^{s} / day
- Inclination: 11.967°
- Longitude of ascending node: 231.17°
- Argument of perihelion: 66.155°

Physical characteristics
- Mean diameter: 25.44 km (calculated); 26.538±0.262 km 27.67±0.52 km
- Synodic rotation period: 10.971±0.002 h
- Geometric albedo: 0.044±0.002; 0.048±0.010; 0.057 (assumed)
- Spectral type: C (assumed)
- Absolute magnitude (H): 11.7 · 11.80; 12.05±0.25

3333 Schaber, provisional designation 1980 TG_{5}, is a dark background asteroid from the outer regions of the asteroid belt, approximately 26 kilometers (16 miles) in diameter. It was discovered on 9 October 1980, by American astronomer Carolyn Shoemaker at the Palomar Observatory in California. The presumably elongated C-type asteroid has a rotation period of 10.97 hours. It was named after American geologist Gerald Schaber of the USGS.

== Orbit and classification ==
Schaber is a non-family asteroid from the main belt's background population. It orbits the Sun in the outer asteroid belt at a distance of 2.4–3.8 AU once every 5 years and 7 months (2,026 days; semi-major axis of 3.13 AU). Its orbit has an eccentricity of 0.22 and an inclination of 12° with respect to the ecliptic.

The asteroid was first observed as 1964 WR at the Purple Mountain Observatory in November 1969. The body's observation arc begins at Palomar on 7 October 1980, or two nights prior to its official discovery observation.

== Physical characteristics ==
Schaber is an assumed C-type asteroid.

=== Rotation period ===
In September 2009, a rotational lightcurve of Schaber was obtained from photometric observations by Maurice Clark at the Montgomery College Observatory in Maryland. Lightcurve analysis gave a rotation period of 10.971 hours with a brightness amplitude of 0.46 magnitude, indicative for a somewhat elongated shape (U=3-).

=== Diameter and albedo ===
According to the surveys carried out by the Japanese Akari satellite and the NEOWISE mission of NASA's Wide-field Infrared Survey Explorer, Schaber measures 26.538 and 27.67 kilometers in diameter and its surface has an albedo of 0.048 and 0.044, respectively.

The Collaborative Asteroid Lightcurve Link assumes a standard albedo for carbonaceous asteroids of 0.057 and calculates a diameter of 25.44 kilometers based on an absolute magnitude of 11.7.

== Naming ==
This minor planet was named after American Gerald Gene Schaber, geologist with the United States Geological Survey, who headed the USGS's astrogeology branch in the 1980s. He has studied the geology of the Moon, Mars, Venus and Mercury as well as that of Jupiter's volcanic moon Io. Schaber also named the North Complex, a feature on the lunar surface. The official naming citation was published by the Minor Planet Center on 26 March 1986 (M.P.C. 10549).
