= Rhysling (crater) =

Crater on the Moon

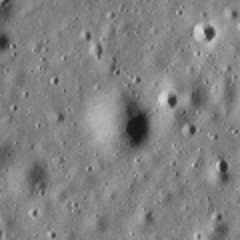
- Apollo 15 panoramic camera image
- Coordinates: 26.07°N 3.62°E
- Diameter: 120 m
- Eponym: Astronaut-named feature

Rhysling is a feature on Earth's Moon, a crater in the Hadley–Apennine region. Astronauts David Scott and James Irwin stopped near the west rim of it in 1971, on the Apollo 15 mission, during EVA 1. Geology Station 3 was about 125 meters west of Rhysling, and a single piece of vesicular basalt was collected there (sample 15016). The rock is sometimes called the seatbelt basalt.

Rhysling is named for the blind poet Rhysling in Robert A. Heinlein’s short story "The Green Hills of Earth."

Rhysling is located less than 1 km east of Hadley Rille, less than 1 km northwest of Earthlight crater, and about 2 km south of the Apollo 15 landing site itself, at Last crater.

The crater was named by the astronauts, and the name was formally adopted by the IAU in 1973.
