= Bennett Hill (lunar mountain) =

Mountain on the Moon

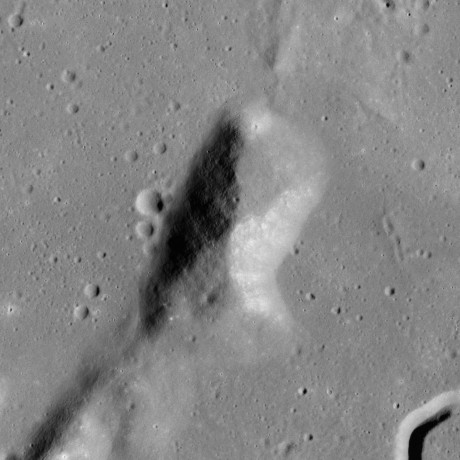
- Apollo 15 mapping camer image

Highest point
- Elevation: 6203 m
- Listing: Lunar mountains
- Coordinates: 25.9°N 2.7°E

Geography
- Location: Hadley–Apennine, the Moon

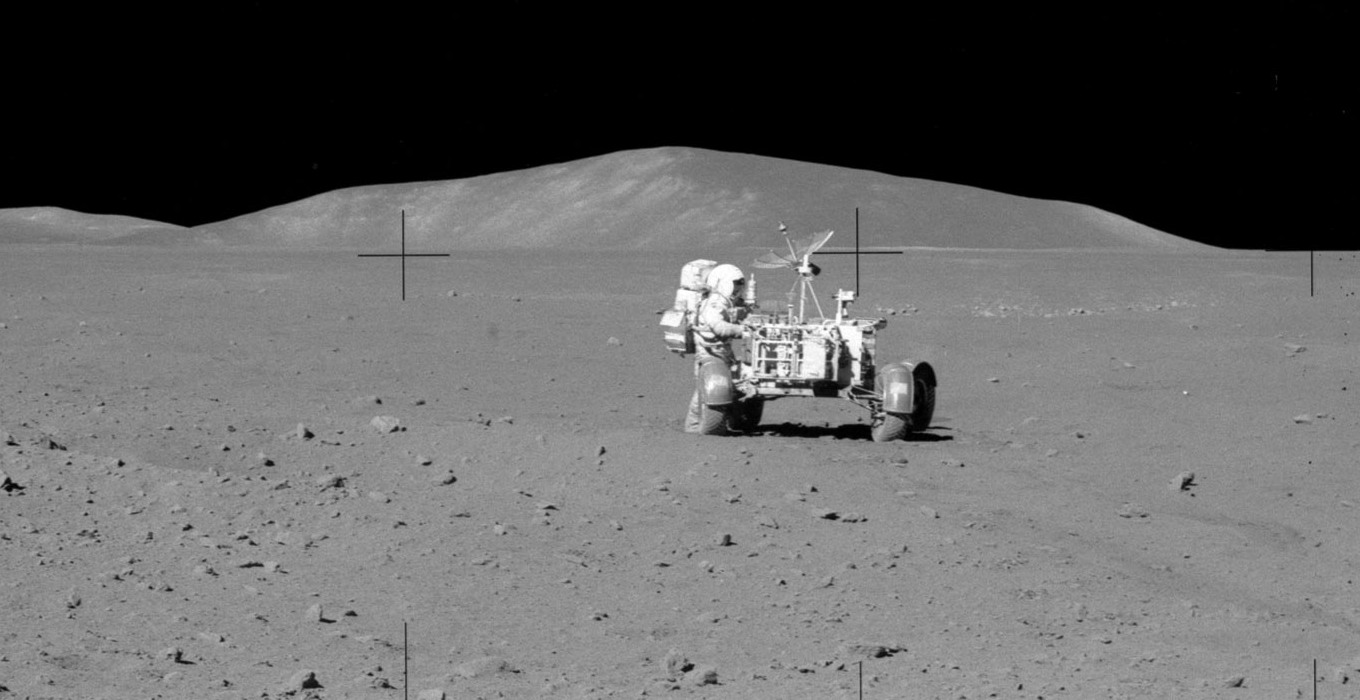
Bennett Hill behind Jim Irwin and the rover, seen from the lunar surface near Hadley Rille.

Bennett Hill is a feature on Earth's Moon, a mountain in the Hadley–Apennine region. Astronauts David Scott and James Irwin landed the Lunar Module Falcon about 27 kilometers (17 mi) east of it in 1971, on the Apollo 15 mission. They could see it on the western horizon from nearly everywhere they went. The peak rises approximately 900 meters (3,000 ft) above the surrounding plain, known as Palus Putredinis.

The astronauts named the feature after NASA trajectory designer Floyd Bennett. The name is informal and not recognized by the IAU, but the name is used in the scientific literature, such as the Apollo 15 Preliminary Science Report.

== See also ==
- Hill 305 (lunar mountain)
