= North Complex =

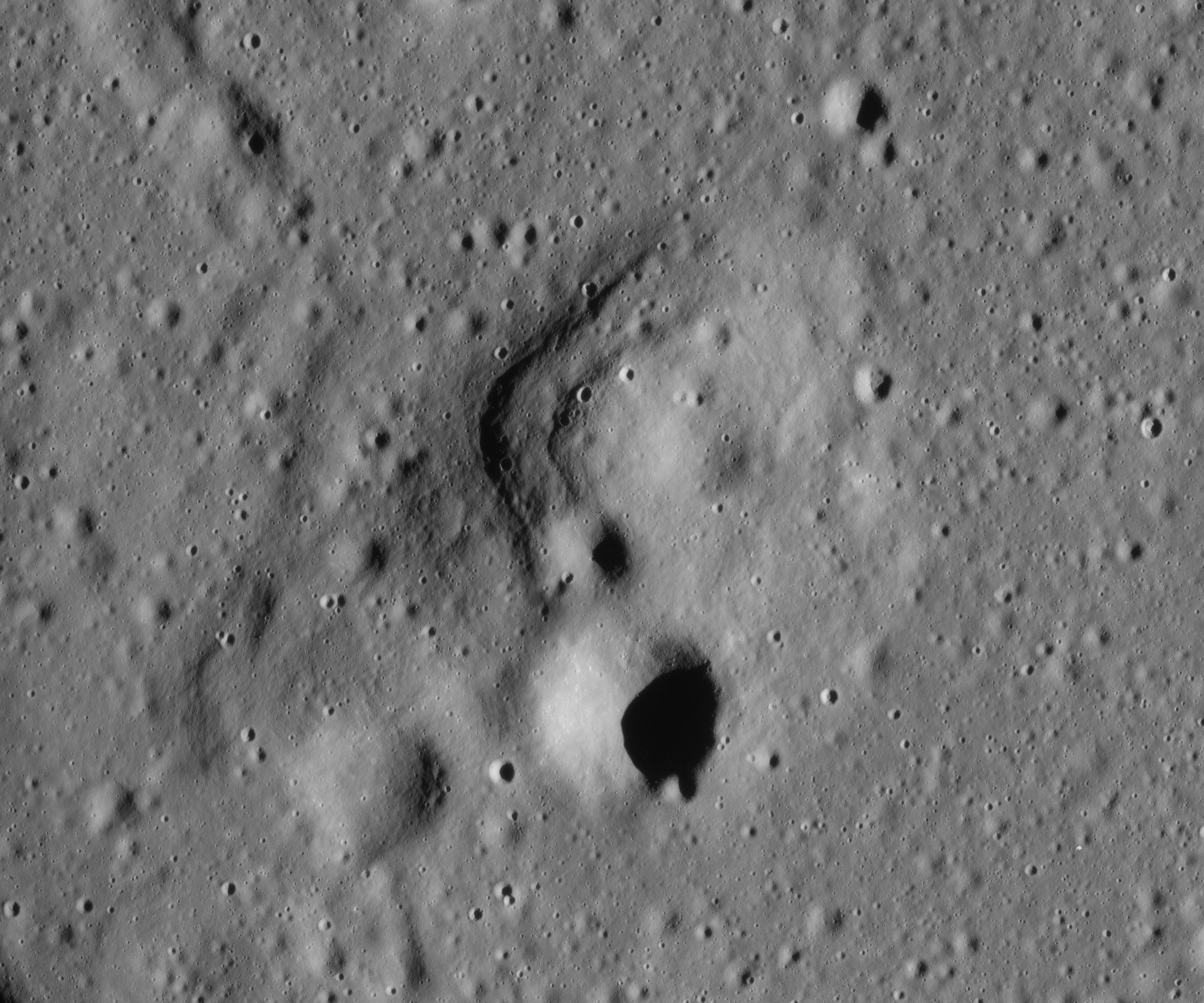
- Apollo 15 panoramic camera image
- Coordinates: 26.25°N 3.59°E
- Diameter: 3.09 km
- Eponym: Astronaut-named feature

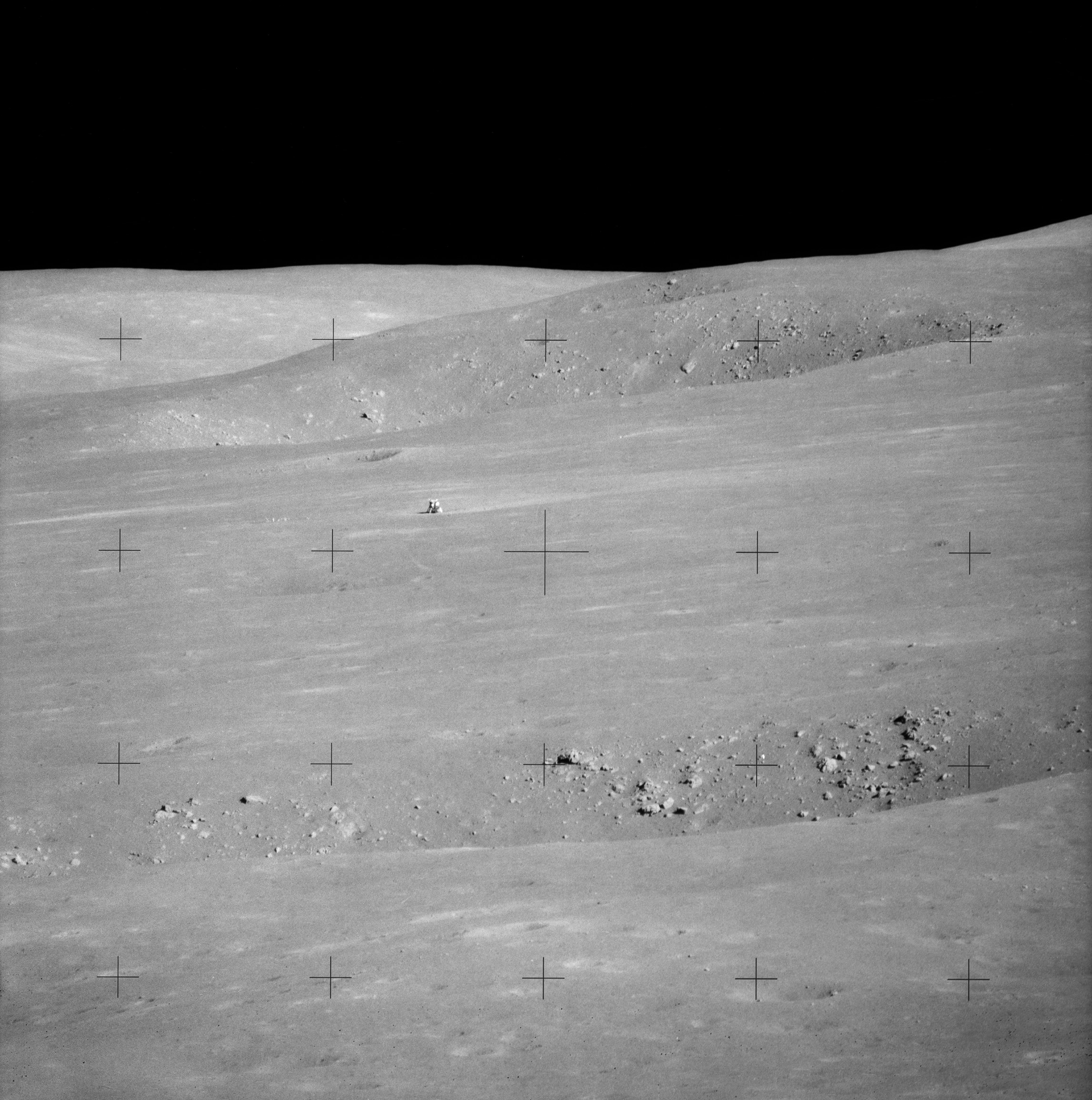
A telephoto view from the slope of Mons Hadley Delta at station 6A facing north shows Dune crater in the foreground, the LM Falcon near the center, and the crater Pluton within the North Complex beyond the LM.

North Complex is a feature on Earth's Moon, a group of hills in the Hadley–Apennine region. It was an intended destination for the astronauts of the Apollo 15 mission, but due to problems extracting a rock core near the landing site, there was not enough time to make the journey. The hills are thought to be volcanic in origin, but this remains unconfirmed because no samples were collected there.

North Complex is located approximately 2 km east of Hadley Rille, and is about 3 km north of the Apollo 15 landing site itself.

The feature was named by the geologist Gerald G. Schaber, and the name was formally adopted by the IAU in 1973. The astronauts actually called the North Complex "Schaber Hill." The astronauts named many of the small craters on the North Complex, including the 800 m diameter crater informally named Pluton.

== See also ==
- 3333 Schaber, asteroid named after Gerald G. Schaber
