= Dune (crater) =

Crater on the Moon

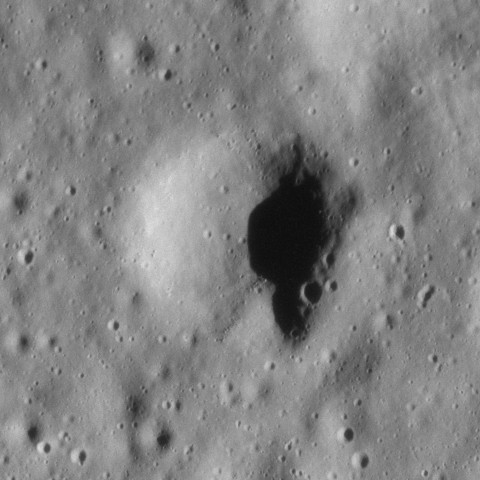
- Apollo 15 panoramic camera image
- Coordinates: 26.04°N 3.66°E
- Diameter: 380 m
- Eponym: Astronaut-named feature

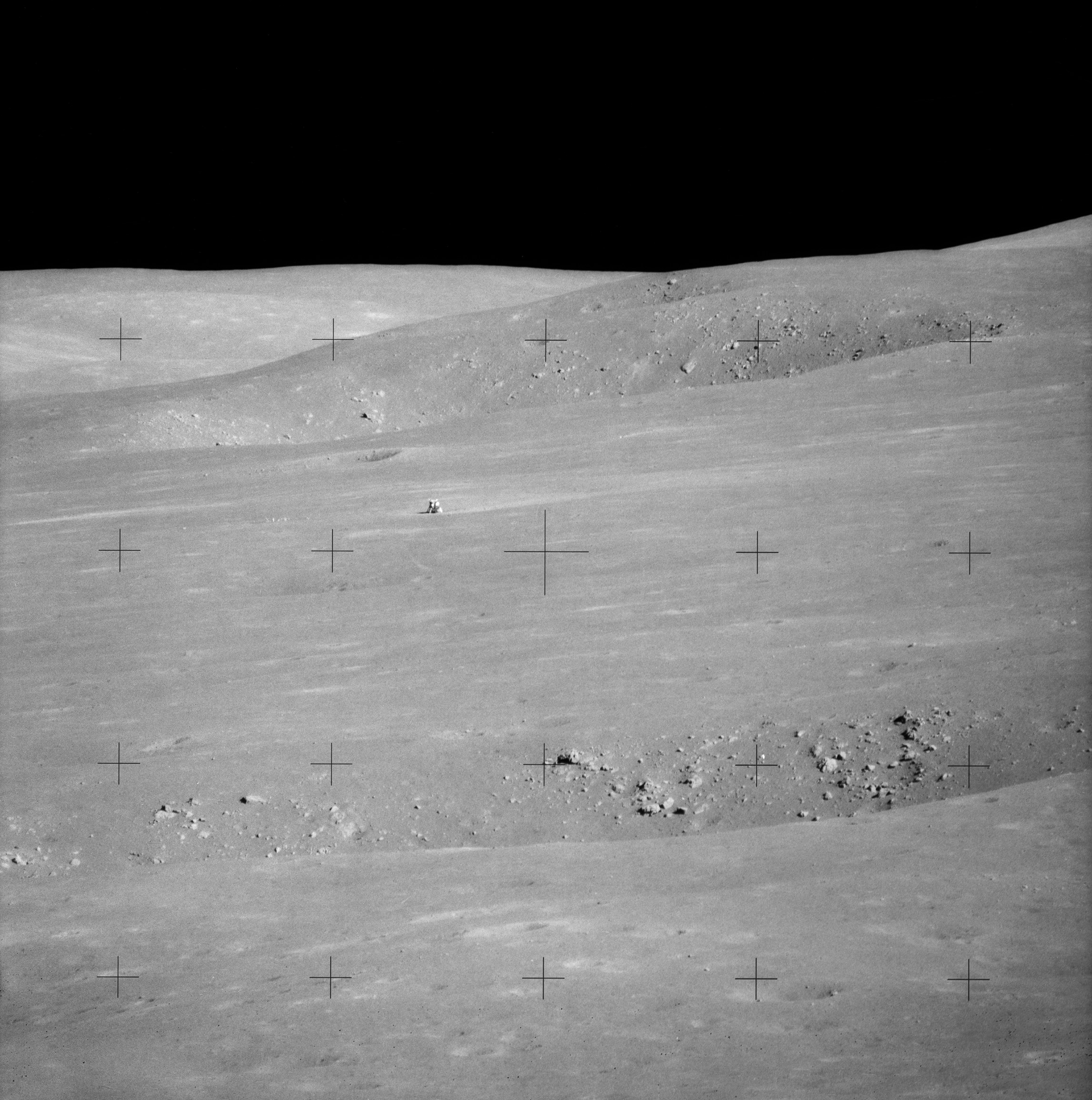
A telephoto view from the slope of Mons Hadley Delta at station 6A facing north shows Dune in the foreground. The LM Falcon is near the center, and the North Complex is beyond the LM.

Dune is a feature on Earth's Moon, a crater in the Hadley–Apennine region. Astronauts David Scott and James Irwin visited the south rim of it in 1971, on the Apollo 15 mission, during EVA 2. The south rim of Dune was designated Geology Station 4 of the mission.

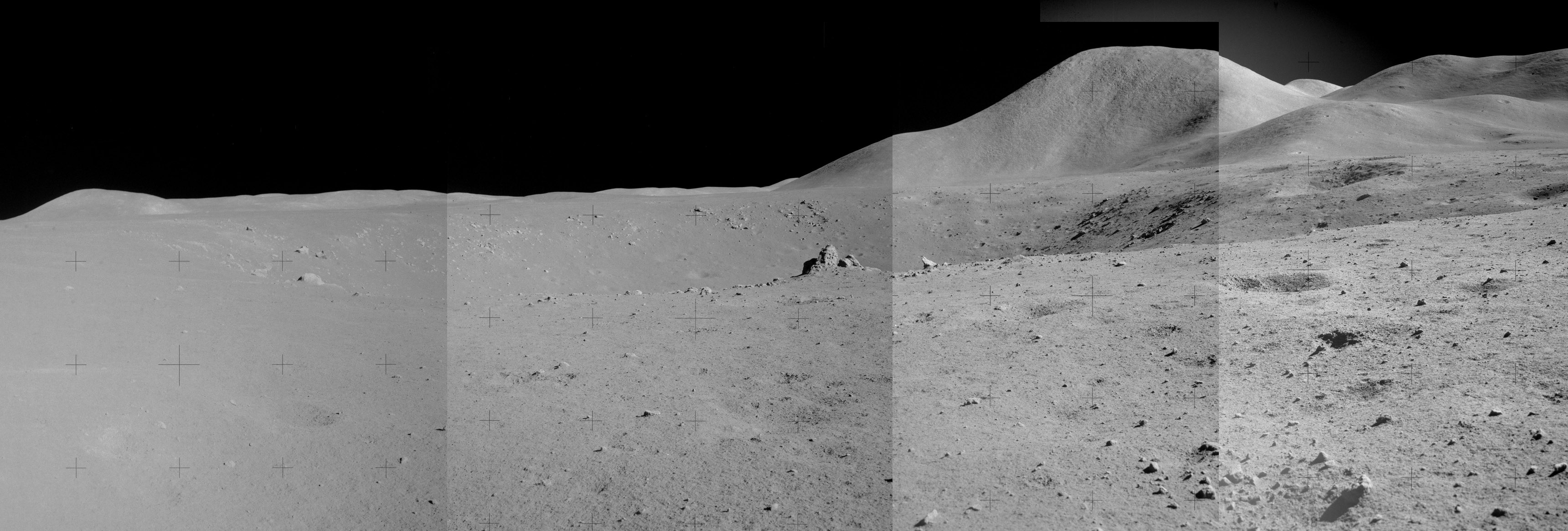
Dune crater, facing north, with Mons Hadley at right. This is part of Pan D-6 in the planimetric map below.

Dune is located about 1.8 km east of Hadley Rille, less than 1 km south of the smaller Earthlight crater, and about 3 km south of the Apollo 15 landing site itself.

The crater was named by the astronauts after the 1965 novel by Frank Herbert, and the name was formally adopted by the IAU in 1973.

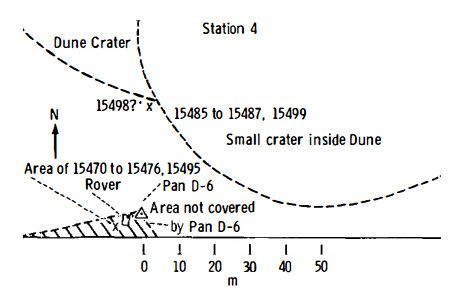
Planimetric map of Station 4 from the Apollo 15 Preliminary Science Report. X indicates sample locations, 5-digit numbers are LRL sample numbers, rectangle is lunar rover (dot indicates TV camera), black spots are large rocks, dashed lines are crater rims or other topographic features, and triangles are panorama stations.

== Samples ==
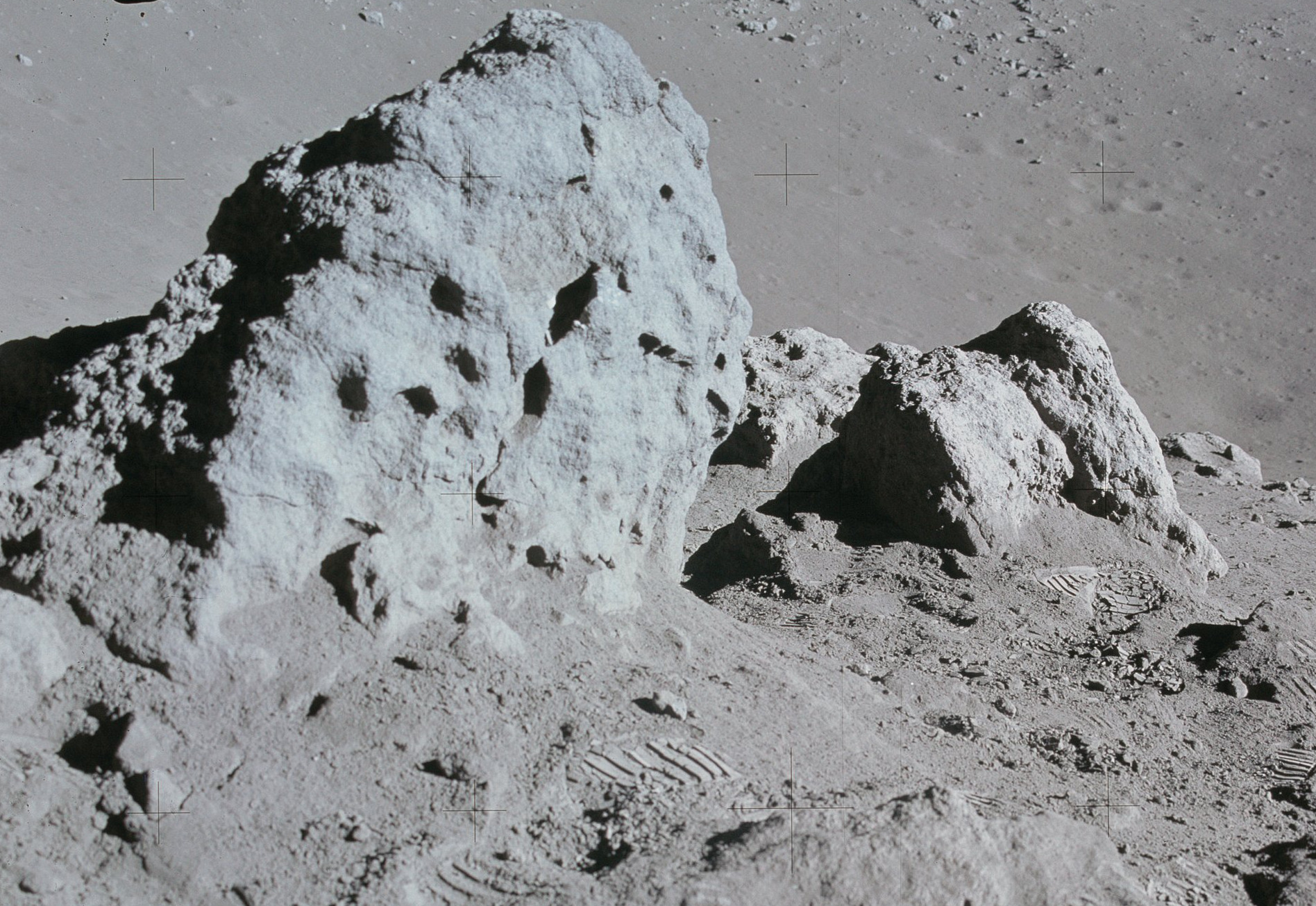
Much of the activity at station 4 was devoted to the boulders shown in this photograph. These boulders are basalts and represent material excavated during the formation of Dune Crater. The crew reported that vesicles were abundant in the boulders at this location and that some vesicles were as large as 9 cm in diameter. The abundance and size of the vesicles in these boulders suggest that this basaltic material cooled on or very near the lunar surface. (NASA Image and caption)

The following samples were collected from Dune Crater (Station 4), as listed in Table 5-II of the Apollo 15 Preliminary Science Report. Sample type, lithology, and description are from Table 5-IV of the same volume.

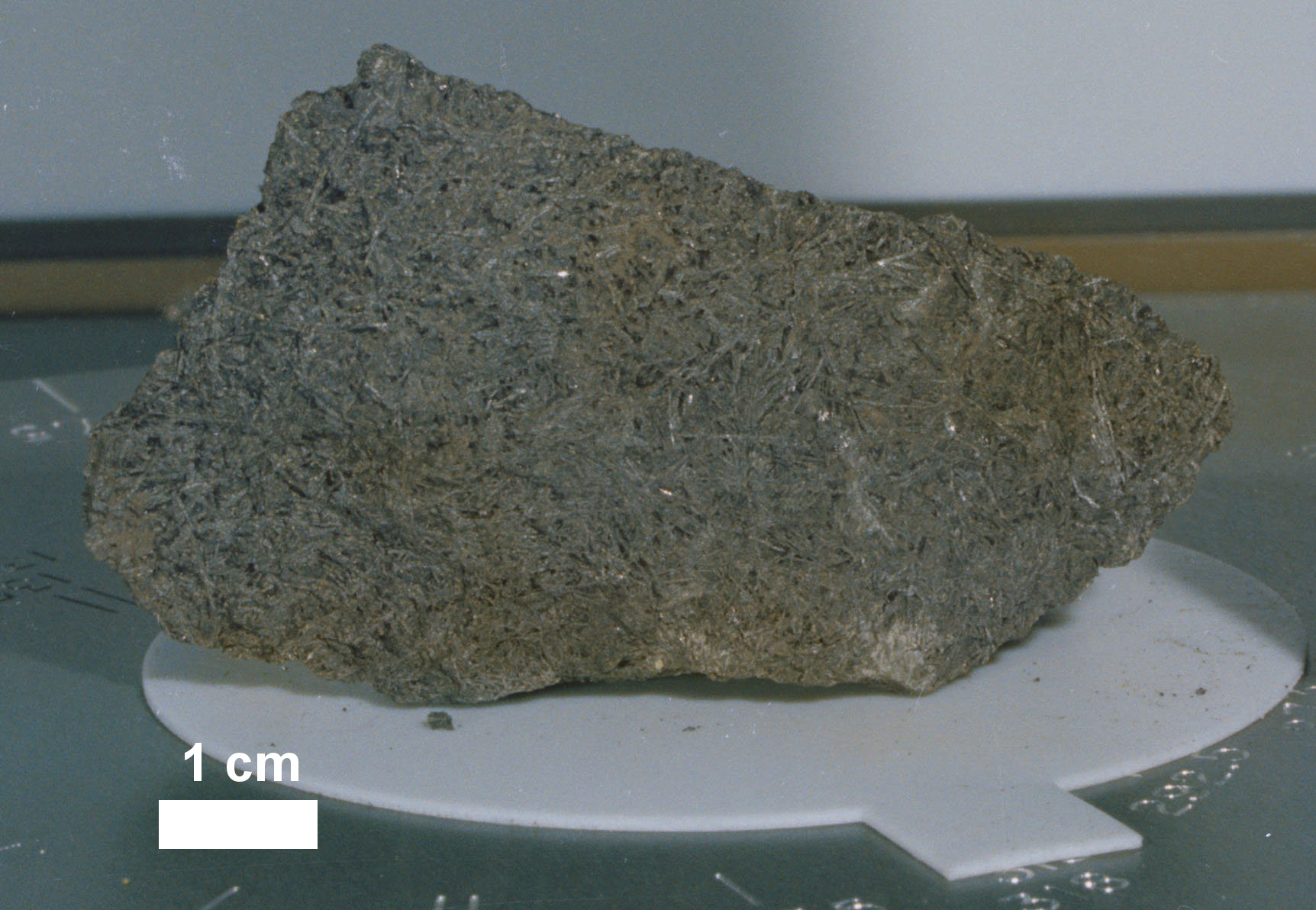
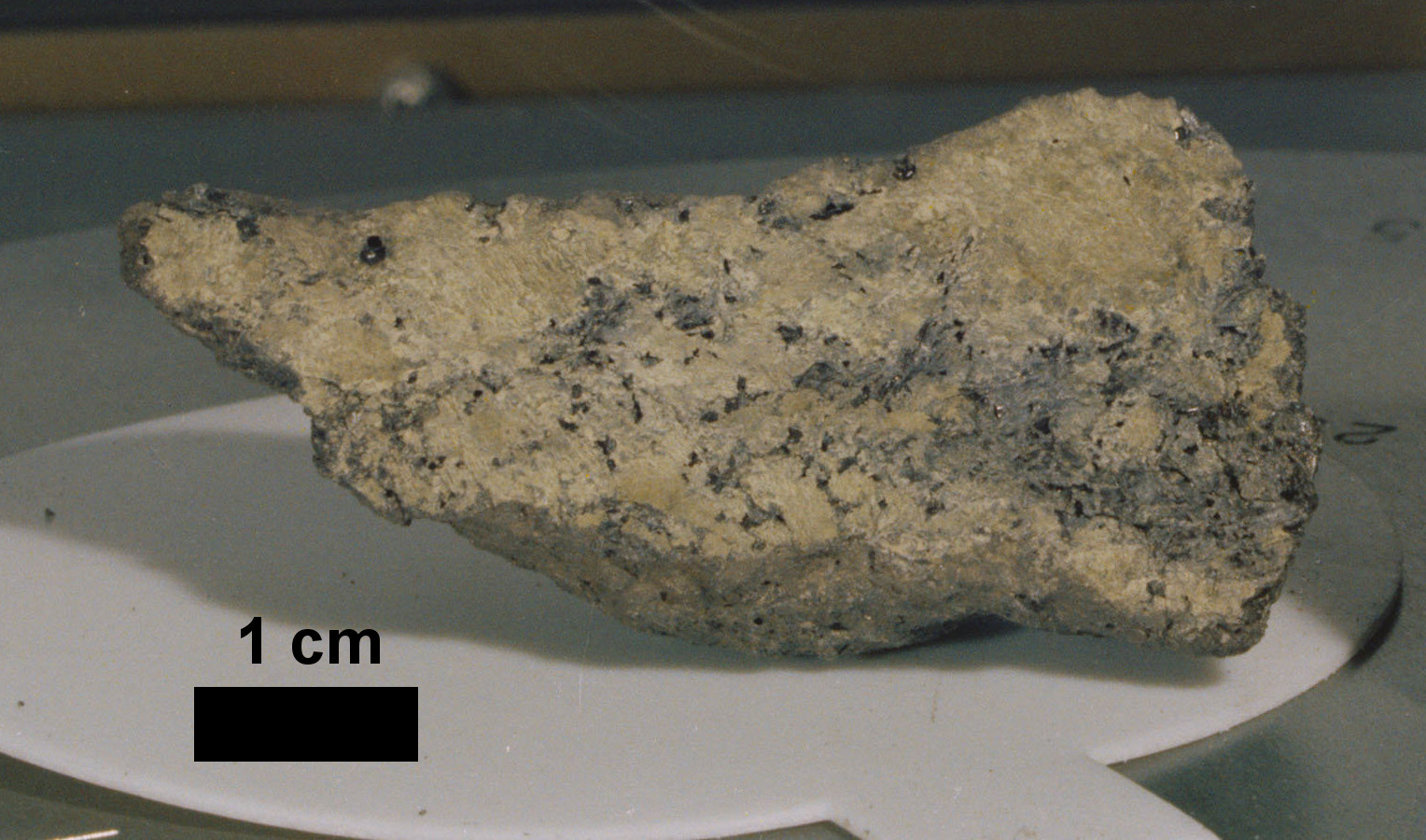
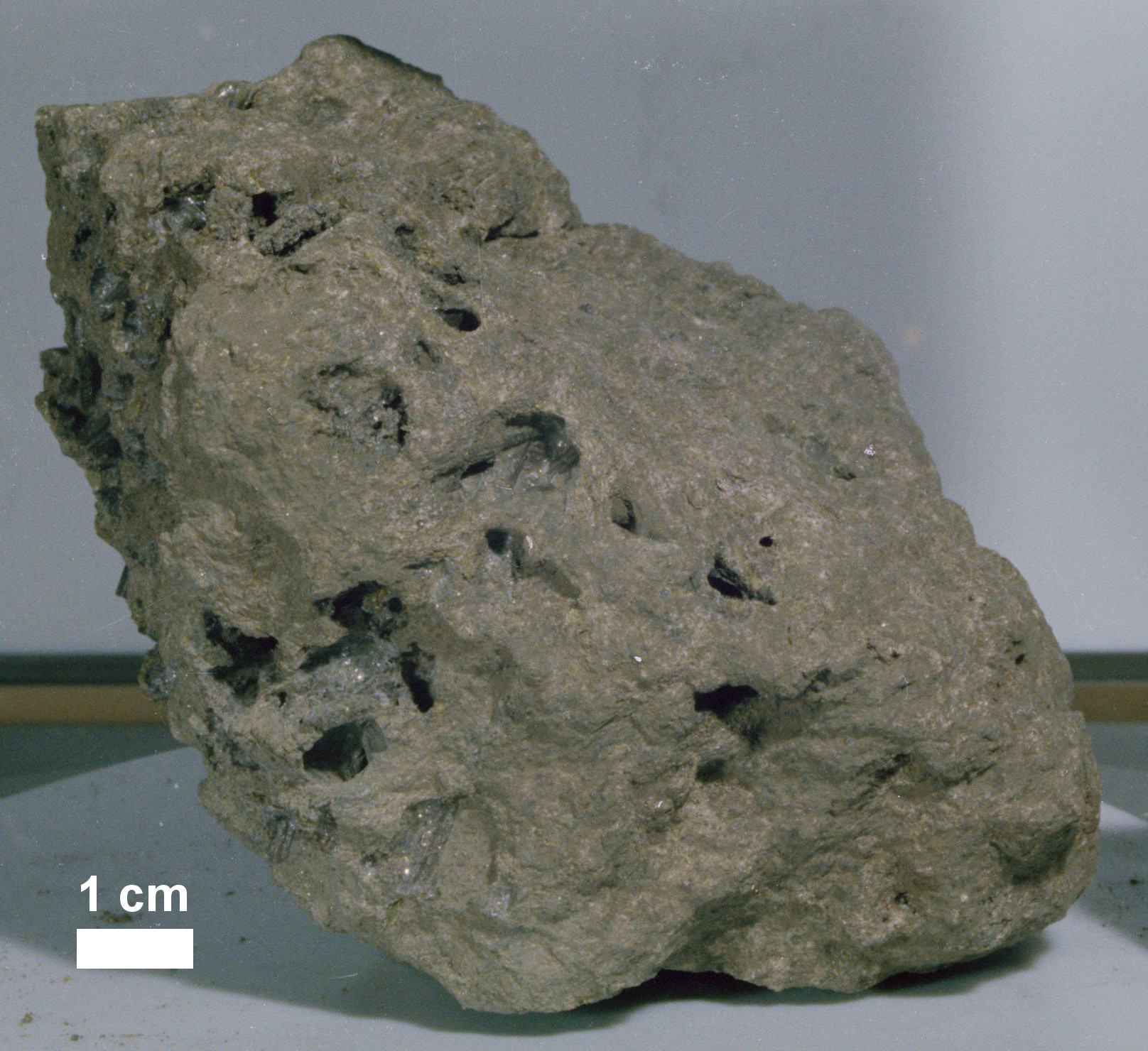
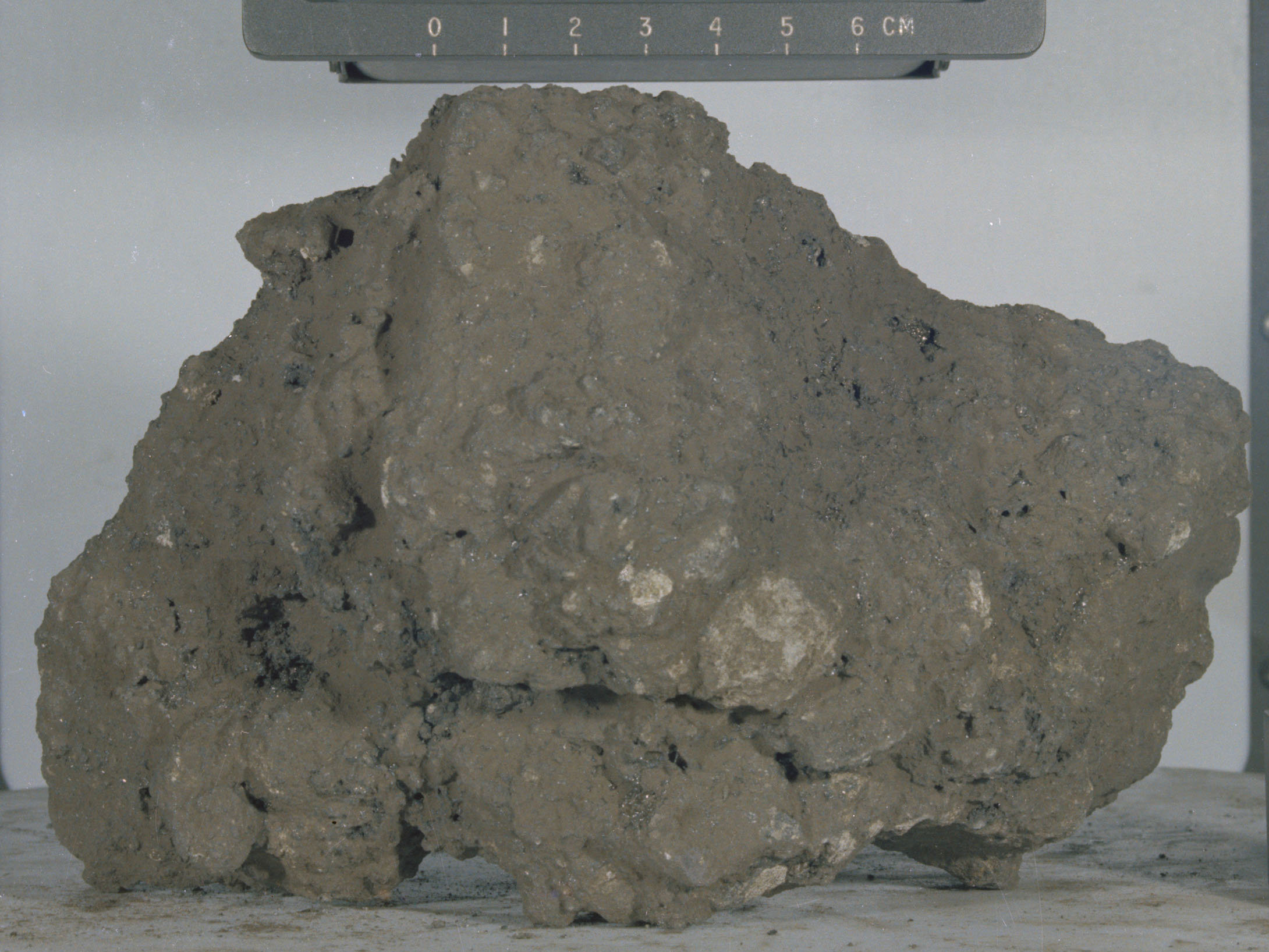
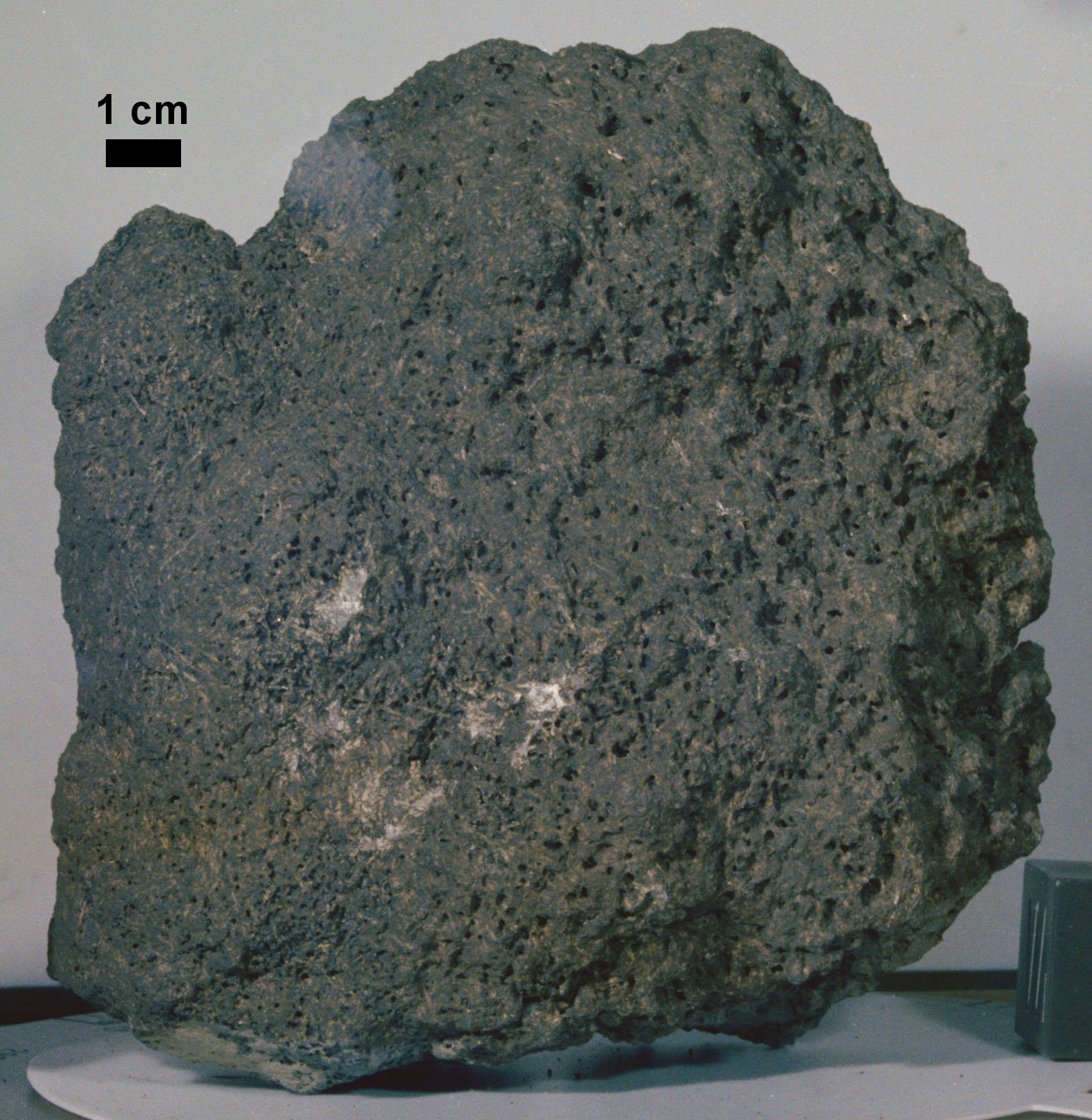
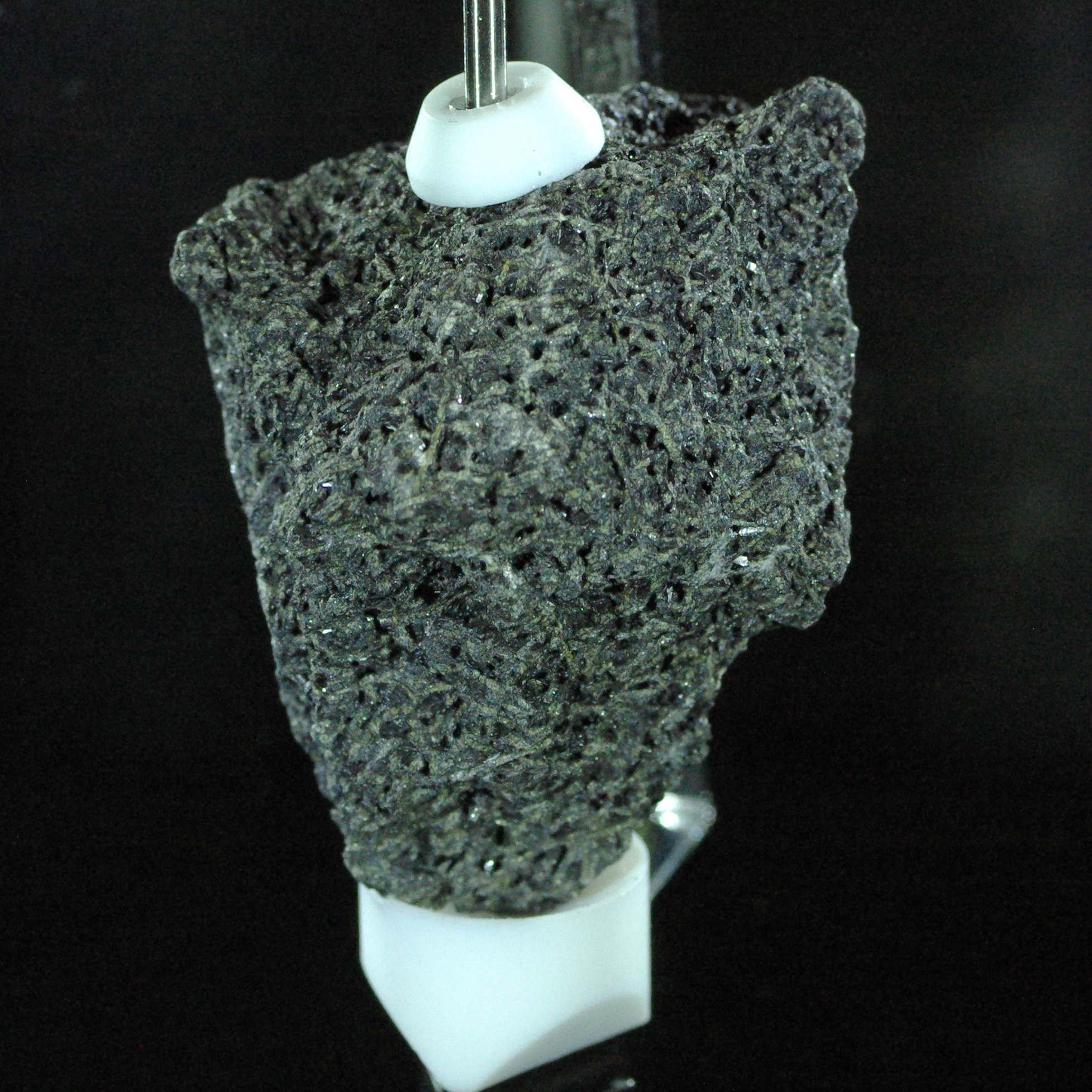
Sample	Photo	Lithology	Description
15470 to 15474	-	soil	Collected with samples 15475 and 15476
15475	-	basalt	Blocky, angular, medium-coarse-grained, porphyritic basalt with pale green prisms to 15 mm long in a slightly vuggy groundmass of plagioclase laths approximately 2 mm long and pale yellow-green pyroxene
15476	-	basalt	Slabby, subangular, porphyritic basalt with brown pyroxene phenocrysts to 15 mm long in a slightly vuggy groundmass of plagioclase, and brown and green mafic silicates
15485		basalt	Blocky, angular basalt with brown pyroxene prisms to 7 mm long in a moderately vuggy groundmass of flow-aligned plagioclase 2 to 3 mm long, and green-brown mafic silicates
15486		basalt	Blocky, angular, porphyritic basalt with brown pyroxene phenocrysts to 7 mm long in a slightly vuggy groundmass of plagioclase laths and pyroxene. Light greenish gray material coats the surface.
15495		basalt	Blocky, subangular, vuggy basalt with dark-brown pyroxene prisms to 10 mm long in vugs.
15498		breccia	A blocky, angular glass-coated breccia with approximately 10% leucocratic clasts bigger than 1 mm. Sizes are seriate and the rock contains 10 to 15% leucocratic clasts 0.5 to 1.0 mm. Dark, vesiclar glass in sharp contact with the breccia covers parts of four sides of the rock. The medium-gray matrix is coherent.
15499		basalt	Blocky, angular, highly vesicular basalt. Vesicles appear to grade in size and abundance across the rock. One surface is coated by light yellowish-gray material grading into very dark brownish-gray coating at one edge. The rock is porphyritic with brown pyroxene prisms to 10 mm long in a groundmass of plagioclase laths and pyroxene.

Samples 15470 to 15476 were collected near where the rover was parked to the south of the rim of Dune. Samples 15485, 15486, and 15499 were collected from the largest boulder in the photograph above. Sample 15498 was collected nearby.
