= Earthlight (crater) =

Crater on the Moon

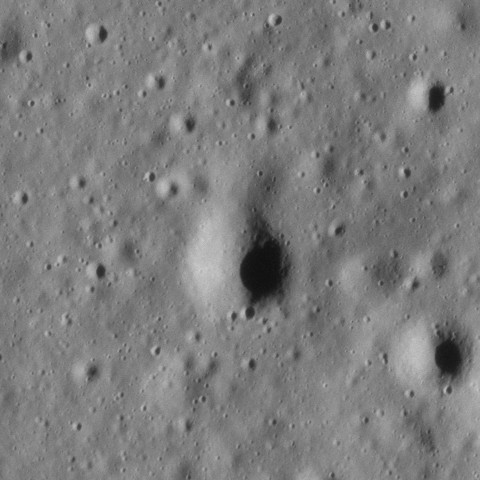
- Apollo 15 panoramic camera image
- Coordinates: 26.06°N 3.65°E
- Diameter: 210 m
- Eponym: Astronaut-named feature

Earthlight is a feature on Earth's Moon, a crater in the Hadley–Apennine region. Astronauts David Scott and James Irwin drove past it on their Lunar Roving Vehicle in 1971, on the Apollo 15 mission, during EVA 2.

Earthlight is located about 1.5 km east of Hadley Rille, less than 1 km north of the larger Dune crater, and about 2 km south of the Apollo 15 landing site itself, at Last crater.

The crater is subdued and not obvious on the surface, and the astronauts did not stop to observe it. During the drive towards Mons Hadley Delta, Jim Irwin said, "I can just barely see the western slope of Earthlight. But the southern slope of it, I can also see, has several blocks on it."

The crater was named by the astronauts after the 1955 novel by Arthur C. Clarke (which takes place in and around Mare Imbrium on the Moon), and the name was formally adopted by the IAU in 1973. Clarke was delighted to receive a three-dimensional map of the landing site signed and sent by the Apollo 15 crew, two decades after the novel was written.
