= Hill 305 (lunar mountain) =

Mountain on the Moon

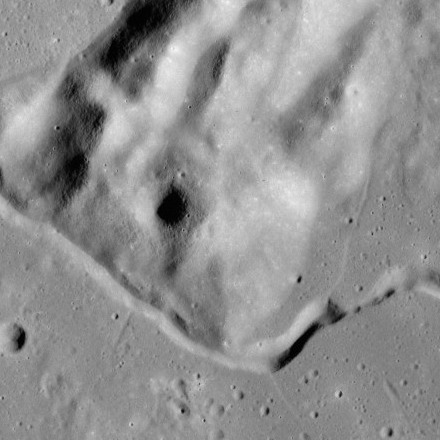
- Apollo 15 mapping camera image

Highest point
- Elevation: 6,605 m (21,670 ft)
- Listing: Lunar mountains

Geography
- Location: Hadley–Apennine, the Moon

Geology
- Mountain type: Dome Mountain

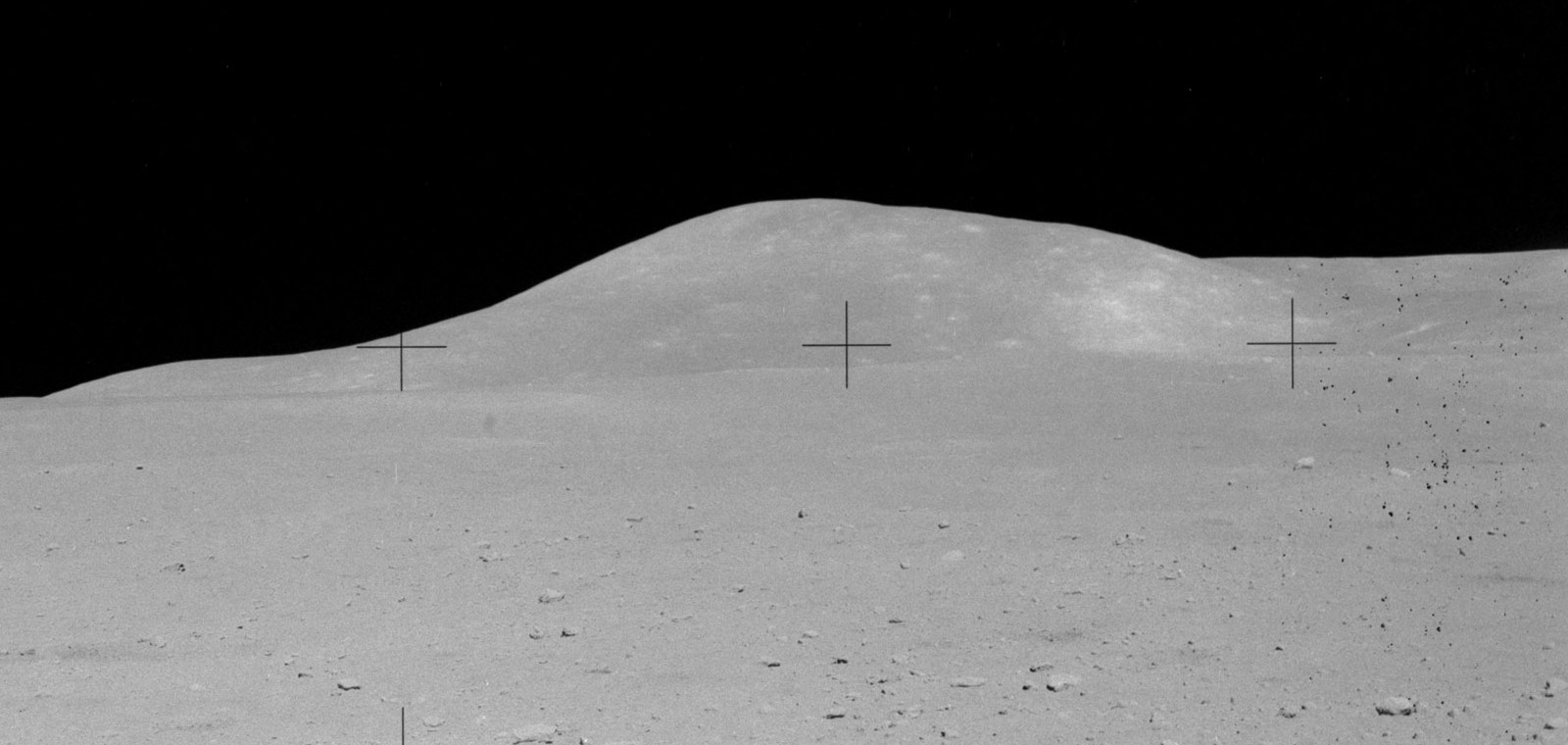
Hill 305 from the lunar surface near Hadley Rille

Hill 305 is a feature on Earth's Moon, a mountain in the Hadley–Apennine region. Astronauts David Scott and James Irwin landed the Lunar Module Falcon about 21 kilometers (13 mi) southeast of it in 1971, on the Apollo 15 mission, but they did not visit it. They could see it on the northwestern horizon from nearly everywhere they went. The peak rises approximately 1,300 meters (4,300 ft) above the surrounding plain, known as Palus Putredinis, and part of Hadley Rille curves along its southern margin.

The astronauts named the feature, although it is somewhat unclear why. David Scott stated that it was probably "305 meters above something, because that's the normal way the Army designates a hill." But Eric Jones states "a more likely explanation is that the name refers to the azimuth of the summit as seen from the landing site which is, indeed, about 305 degrees (east of north)." The name is informal and not recognized by the IAU, but the name is used in the scientific literature, such as the Apollo 15 Preliminary Science Report.

== See also ==
- Bennett Hill (lunar mountain)
