= Spur (lunar crater) =

Surface depression on the Moon

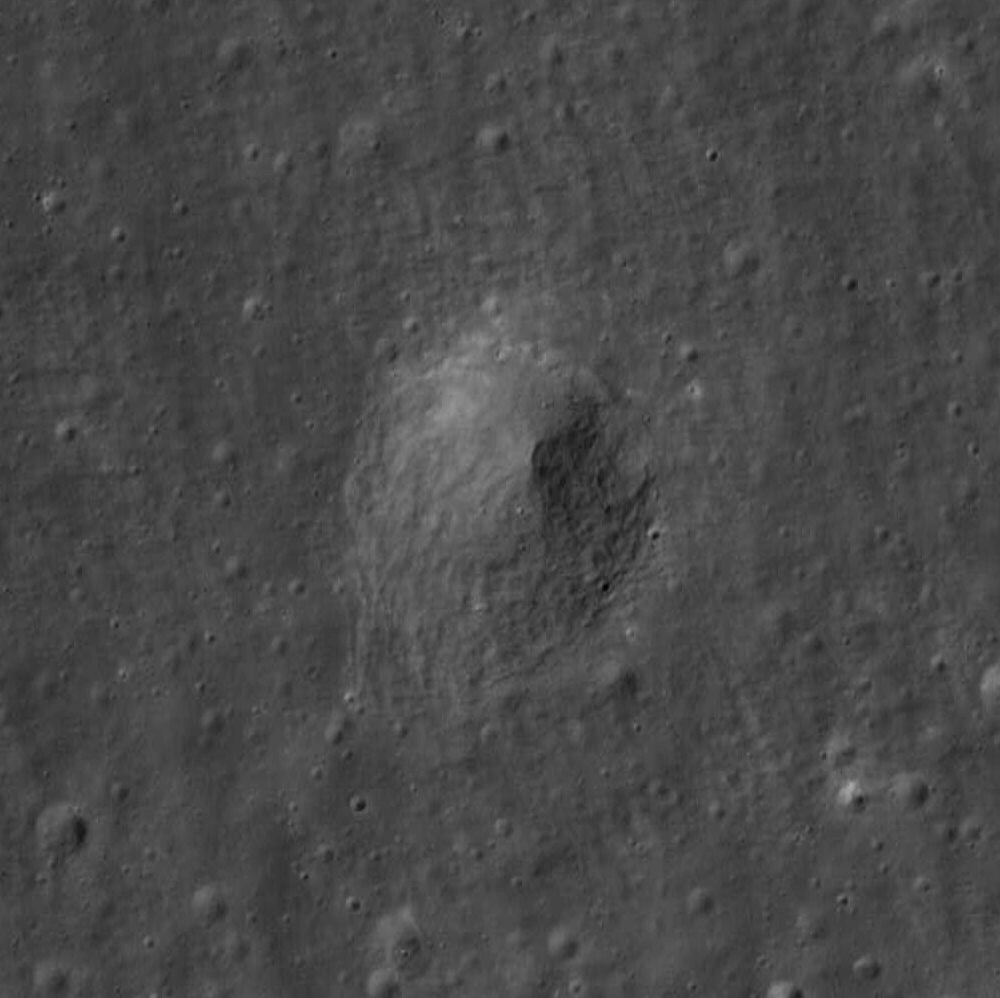
- LRO image
- Coordinates: 25.98°N 3.67°E
- Diameter: 80 m
- Eponym: Astronaut-named feature

Spur is a feature on Earth's Moon, a crater in the Hadley–Apennine region. Astronauts David Scott and James Irwin visited it in 1971, on the Apollo 15 mission, during EVA 2. Spur was designated Geology Station 7.

Spur is located on the north slope of Mons Hadley Delta, about 200 m above the plain to the north. It is east of the much larger St. George crater, and about 5 km south of the Apollo 15 landing site itself.

The astronauts found the "Genesis Rock", sample 15415, at Spur. The sample contains a large clast of anorthosite, and Dave Scott said "Guess what we just found! I think we found what we came for" as he examined the sample. They also found samples 15445 and 15455, so-called black and white breccias, which are thought to be impact melt breccia resulting from the Imbrium basin impact event.

The crater was named by the astronauts, and the name was formally adopted by the IAU in 1973.

== Gallery ==
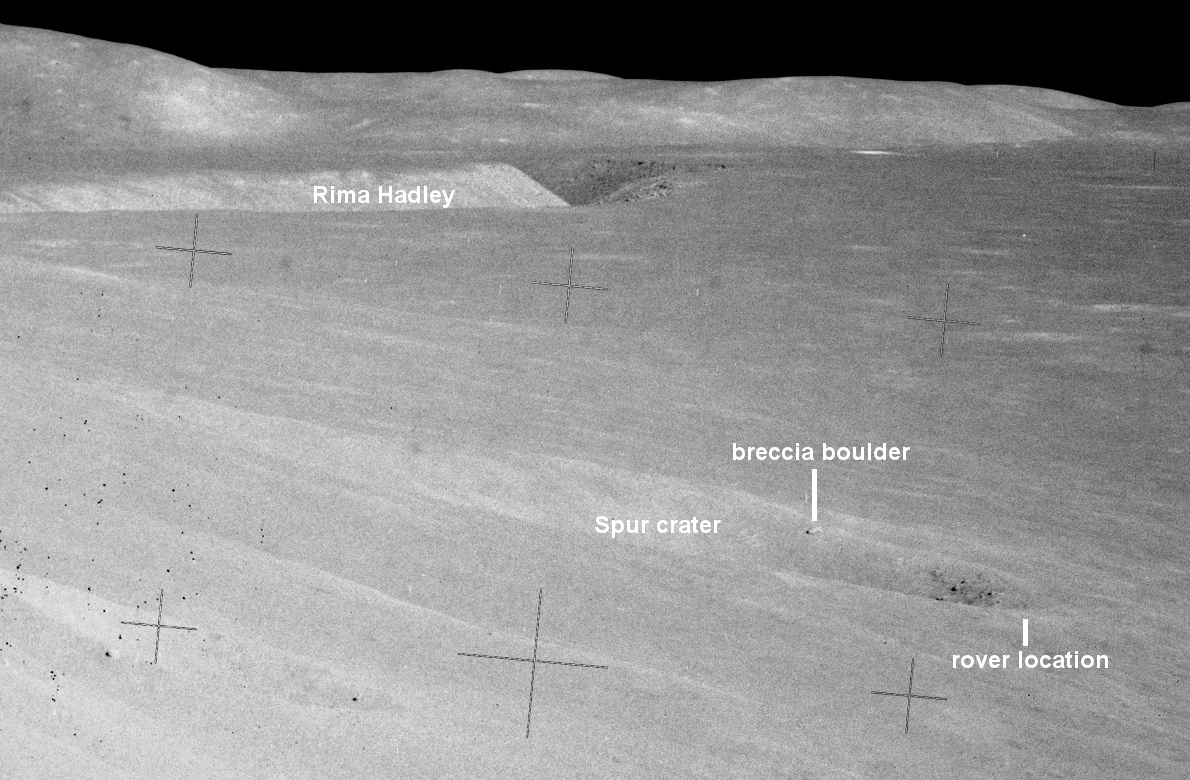
View of Spur from station 6A, facing northwest

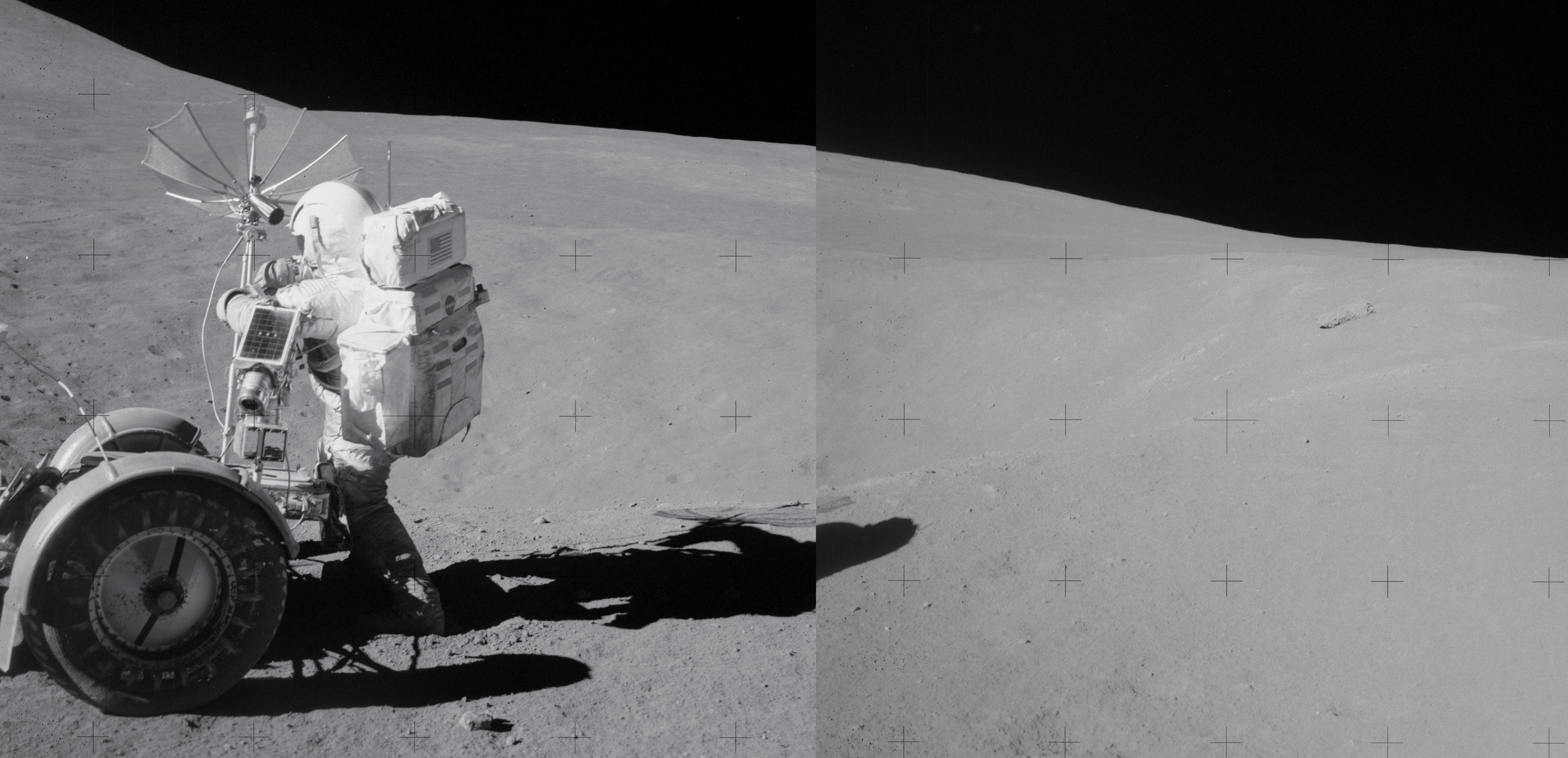
Spur crater in background, with astronaut David Scott at left next to rover. The breccia boulder is at right in the distance.

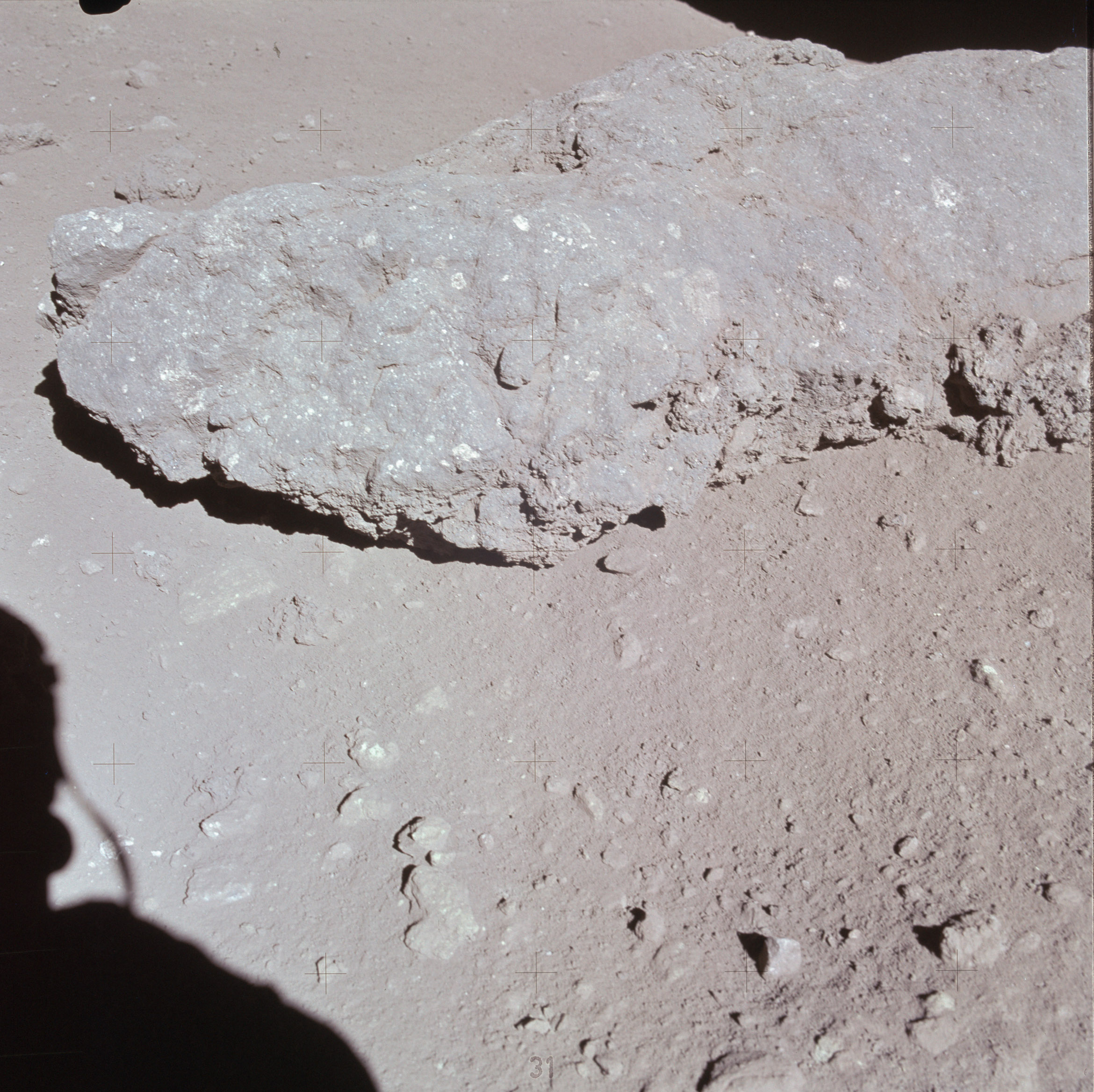
Boulder of impact melt ("breccia block") photographed and sampled at Spur crater. Sample 15445 is believed to be a fragment of the boulder.

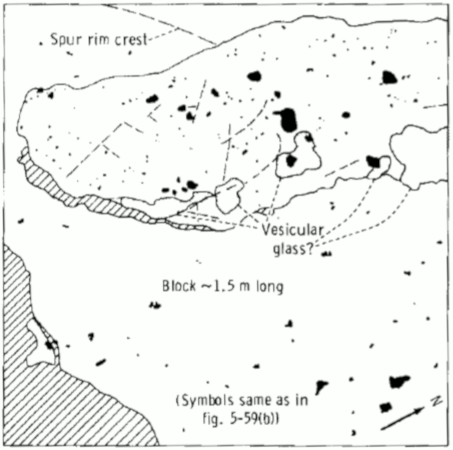
NASA Sketch map of surface of breccia block, showing light clasts in and around block, fractures and glass coatings on block.

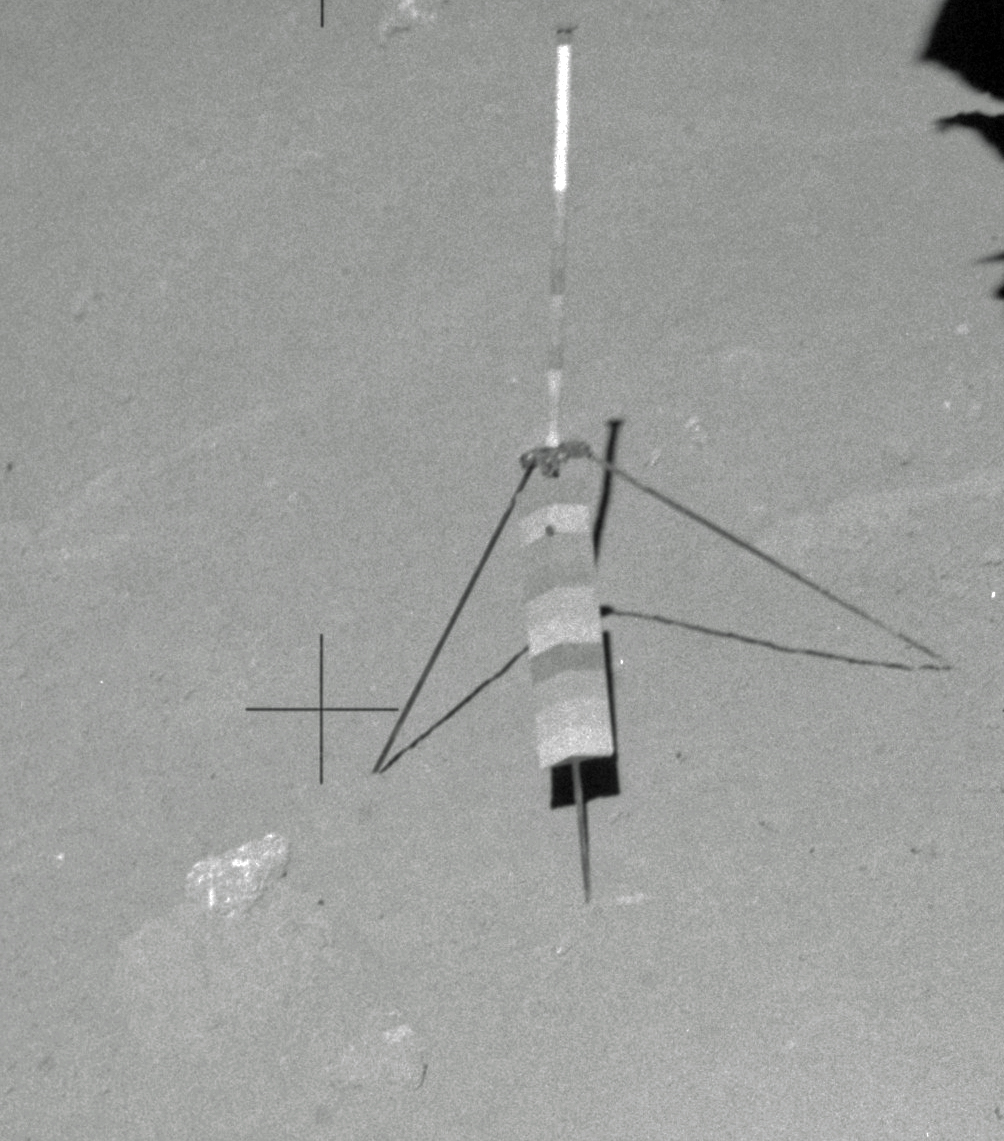
Genesis Rock in situ on the lunar surface prior to sampling (left of the gnomon, which was used for scale in the photos)

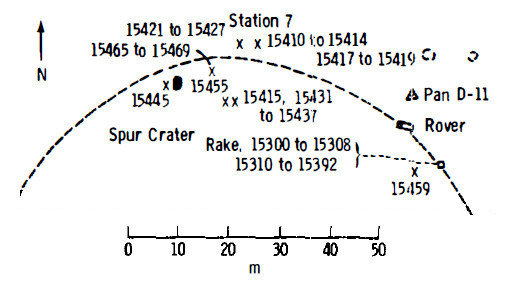
Planimetric map of Station 7. X indicates sample locations, 5-digit numbers are LRL sample numbers, rectangle is lunar rover (dot indicates TV camera), black spots are large rocks, dashed lines are crater rims or other topographic features, and triangles are panorama stations.

== Samples ==
The following samples were collected from Spur crater (Station 7), as listed in Table 5-II of the Apollo 15 Preliminary Science Report. Sample type, lithology, and description are from Table 5-IV of the same volume.

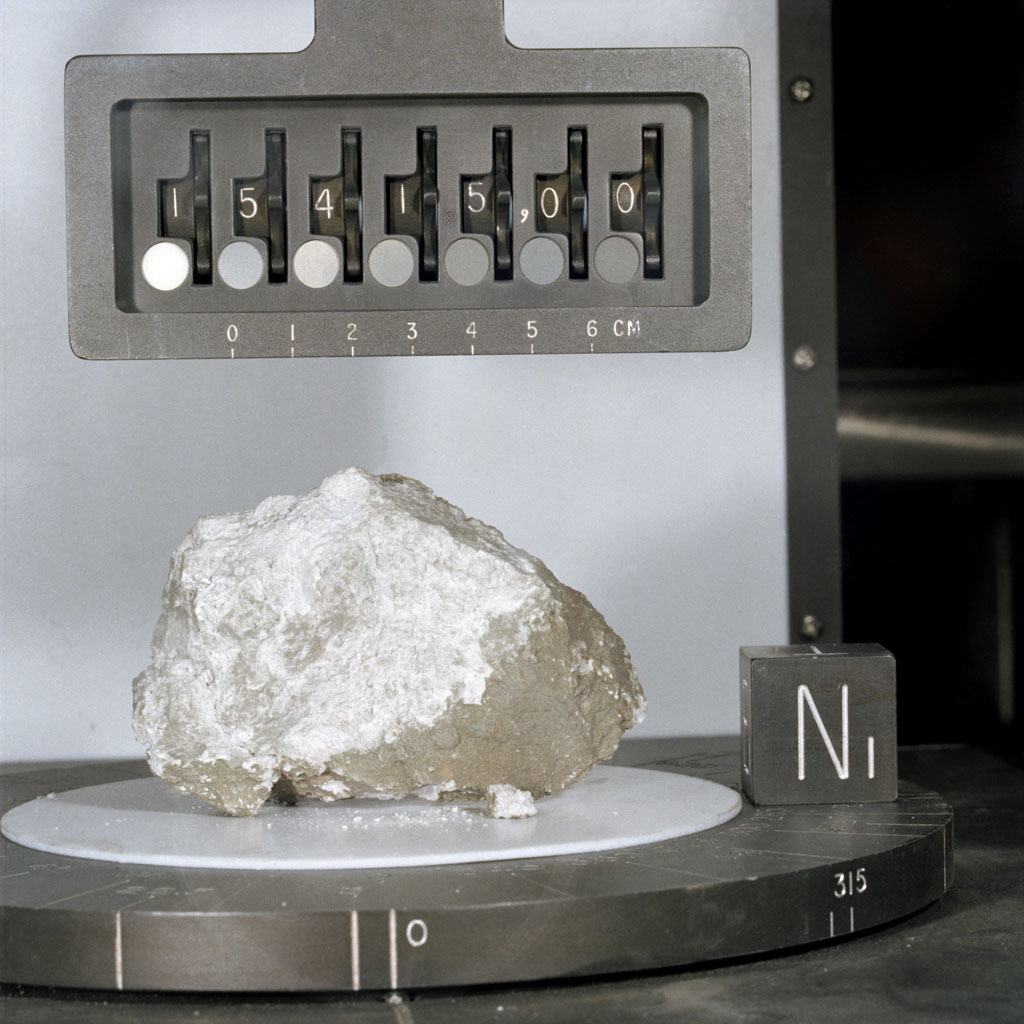
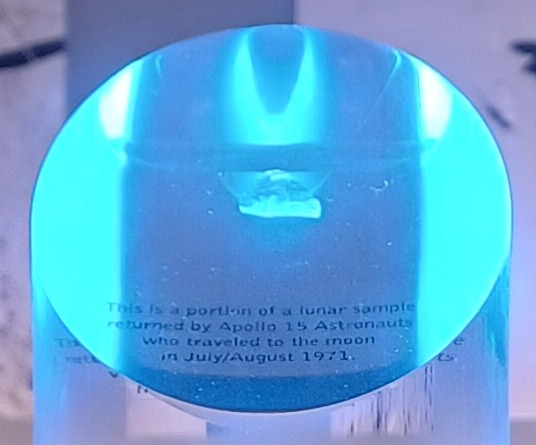
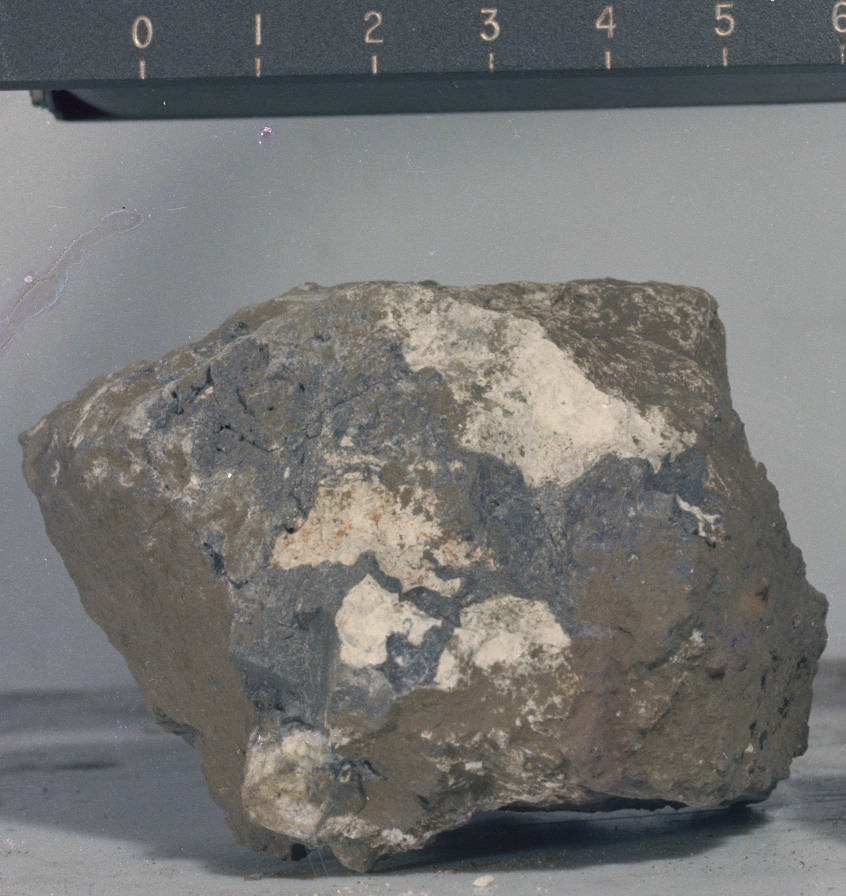
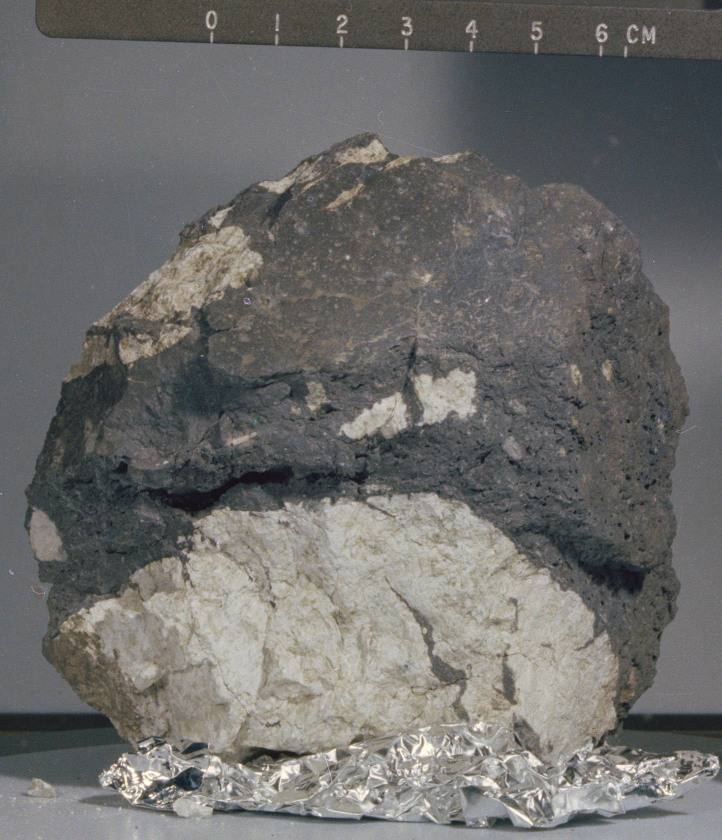
| Sample | Photo | Lithology | Description |
| 15300 to 15304 | - | soil | Soil collected with the comprehensive sample. |
| 15305 to 15308 | - | fragments | Fragments collected with the comprehensive soil sample. |
| 15310 to 15392 | - | fragments | Fragments collected in the comprehensive rake sample. |
| 15410 to 15414 | - | soil | Soil collected with samples 15417 to 15419. |
| 15415 | | breccia | A blocky, angular to subangular rock composed largely of coarse plagioclase. Chalky-white zones or bands suggest shattering. One set of close-spaced parallel fractures exists. |
| 15417 | - | breccia | A small, 1.3-g, blocky, subrounded, fine breccia with 1 to 2 percent leucrocratic clasts bigger than 1 mm. Sizes are seriate with 20 percent leucrocratic clasts in the range of 0.5 to 1.0 mm. The medium-gray matrix is coherent. |
| 15418 | | breccia | A blocky, angular breccia with 5 to 10 percent leucocratic clasts bigger than 1 mm. Sizes are seriate with 10 to 20 percent leucocratic clasts in the range of 0.5 to 1.0 mm. The light- to medium-gray matrix is coherent and has a few percent spherical vesicles to 10 mm across, most of which are concentrated at one end of the specimen. |
| 15419 | - | breccia | A blocky subangular breccia partly coated with dark vesicular glass with approximately 5 percent leucocratic clasts bigger than 1 mm (up to 6 mm); some are basaltic fragments with brown pyroxene. Sizes are seriate with approximately 15 percent clasts, many of which appear to be brownish basalts, in the size range of 0.5 to 1.0 mm. The light gray matrix is coherent. |
| 15421 to 15424 | - | soil | Flnes collected with or broken from fragments 15425 and 15426. |
| 15425 | - | breccia | Blocky, subrounded fragments (probably broken in transit) of friable, light grayish-green microbreccia with a small percentage of chalky-white clasts smaller than 1 mm. |
| 15426 | - | breccia | Blocky, subrounded fragments (probably broken in transit) of friable, light grayish-green microbreccia with variable percentages of chalky-white clasts to 1 mm. |
| 15427 ,1 to 22 | - | soil | Chips larger than 1 cm diameter collected with or broken from 15425 and 15426. |
| 15431 to 15434 | - | soil | Fines collected with or broken from the clod beneath sample 15415. |
| 15435 to 15437 | - | fragments | Fragments larger than 1 cm diameter collected with or broken from the clod beneath sample 15415. |
| 15445 | | breccia | A blocky, angular breccia with 20 t o 25 percent very irregular, embayed leucocratic clasts to 4 cm across. Sizes are bimodal with a small percentage of leucocratic clasts smaller than I mm. The large clasts are mostly chalky white, but one has approximately 5 to 10 percent of a red mineral. The clasts are veined by the matrix as in sample 15455. The dark-gray matrix is coherent and has a few percent irregular vugs. |
| 15455 | | breccia | A blocky, angular breccia with approximately 45 percent leucocratic clasts to 8 cm across. Sizes are bimodal with 1 percent leucocratic clasts less than 1 mm. The largest clast has very irregular embayed boundaries with the matrix and is cut by veins of matrix material that are irregular in course and width. This clast also has perhaps 25 percent 1- to 3-mm patches of light-gray material in chalky-white material. Smaller leucocratic clasts are concentrated in a band or pod. The dark-gray matrix is coherent and has a few percent vugs concentrated near one large clast. |
| 15459 | - | breccia | A blocky, angular breccia with approximately 15 percent leucocratic clasts bigger than 1 mm (to 80 mm). Sizes are seriate with approximately 15 percent leucocratic clasts in the size range of 0.5 to 1.0 mm and a small percentage o f dark-gray clasts. Most clasts arc chalky white, and some have a greenish-gray cast. The medium-gray matrix is coherent. |
| 15465 | - | breccia | A blocky, angular breccia. The rock is composed of angular fragments, some shattered, of breccia held together by dark, vesicular glass. The breccia has approximately 5 to 7 percent leucocratic clasts bigger than 1 mm and a few melanocratic clasts. Sizes are seriate to resolution with approximately 10 percent leucocratic clasts in the size range of 0.5 to 1.0 mm. The light-gray matrix is moderately coherent. |
| 15466 | - | breccia | Rock similar to 15465, found underneath another rock. |
| 15467 | - | breccia | Glass-coated fragment similar to 15465 and 15466. |
| 15468 | - | breccia | Not identified in lunar-surface photographs. |
