= Solo operations of Apollo 15 =

Proceedings of Alfred Worden's time in lunar orbit as part of the NASA mission

During the 1971 Apollo 15 mission to the Moon, and its three days of exploration on the lunar surface by David Scott and James Irwin, Command Module Pilot (CMP) Al Worden had a busy schedule of observations. Apollo 15 was the first mission to carry the Scientific Instrument Module (SIM) bay, which contained a panoramic camera, gamma ray spectrometer, mapping camera, laser altimeter and mass spectrometer. Worden had to operate the shutter and lenses on the cameras and turn on and off the various instruments. During the coast back to Earth, he would perform an EVA to retrieve film cassettes from the cameras.

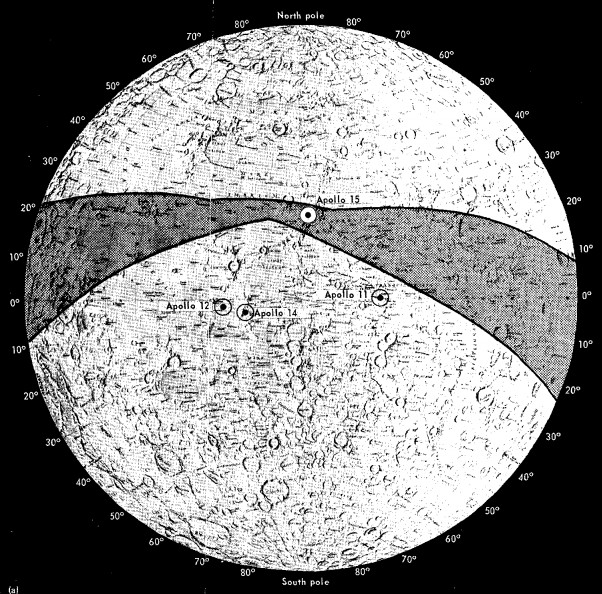
Orbital ground track envelope, near side

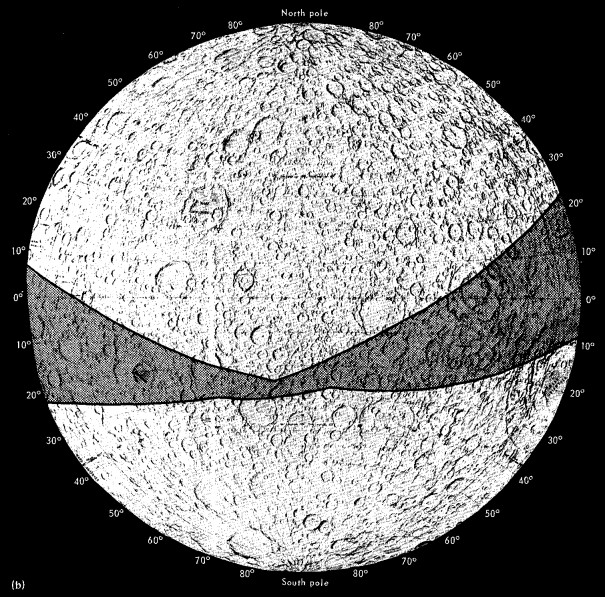
far side

== Day 1 ==
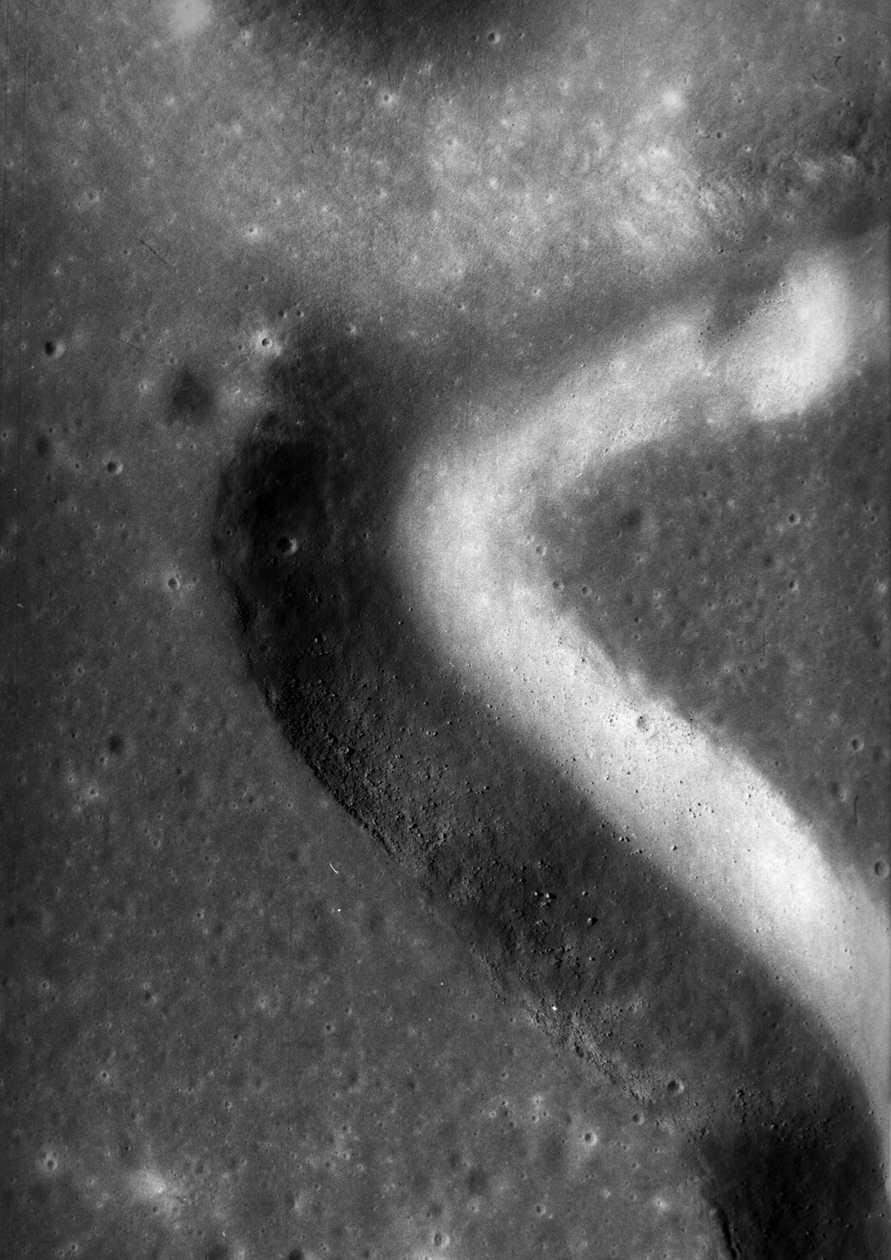
A section of a panoromic camera photograph showing a high resolution view of the landing site. Boulders are easily seen in the rille and the ground disturbed by the lunar module engine shows as a white patch at lower left. South is up.

Many of his observations were of far side features that had not been seen in great detail. The panoramic camera was a modified version of the U.S. Air Force's KA-80A camera for its spy satellites, using a 610 mm f/3.5 lens. This particular camera was similar to those used by the Lockheed U-2, A-12 Oxcart and SR-71 Blackbird. It could see features as small as 3 ft (1 m) across on the lunar surface. It would take long strips, 205 by 13 mi (330 by 21 km) of the surface, on 3.8 foot by 4.5 inch (114.8 by 11.4 cm) strips of film. Over the course of the mission it would take 1,529 usable images, exposing 2 km of film. The film cassette weighed 55 lb (25 kg).

The other camera in the SIM bay was the Mapping Camera. This consisted of two cameras, the Metric Camera and the Stellar Camera. The Metric Camera took square frames of film, covering about 27,000 km^{2} of the lunar surface, with a resolution of about 20 m. Using the stellar camera, Réseau plates (which added the familiar crosses to Apollo photographs), and other data provided by the laser altimeter, it was possible to identify the exact position on the lunar surface of the photograph taken. A total of 2,240 usable photographs were produced.

The Laser Altimeter could measure the height of the CSM above the lunar surface to within one meter. It used a pulsed ruby laser operating at 694.3 nanometers and 200 millijoule pulses of 10 nanoseconds duration. The Stellar Camera was used during the runs of the Laser Altimeter on the night side of the Moon. It would show the exact position of the laser beam, for calibration of the altimeter's results.

During his first pass over the landing site, after landing, Worden attempted to see Falcon using the 28 times magnification sextant. He was successful, refining the position of the site. This was of great help to mission planners as it would help them further refine the planning of the traverses by Scott and Irwin, and also help with photographic interpretation from the surface.

Another experiment performed on Apollo 15 involved using the radio signal of Endeavour and was termed the Downlink bistatic radar Experiment to find the dielectric constant of the surface material. During the 17th near side pass, while Worden was eating his dinner, the spacecraft was oriented so that its radio signal would reflect off the Moon and be received by the Earth. The strength of this signal varies with the angle of incidence. The Brewster's angle is when the signal is the weakest and is a function of the dielectric constant.

Before going to sleep, Worden orientated the spacecraft best for the various experiments of the SIM bay, specifically the spectrometers.

The Gamma-ray Spectrometer detected radiation with energies of 1 MeV to 10 MeV. As the gamma ray passed through a cylinder of doped sodium iodide, it would emit light that would be detected by a photomultiplier tube. Another photomultiplier tube detected charged particles that passed through a plastic shield around the cylinder. All of this was on the end of a 25 ft (7.6 m) boom that would be deployed and retracted periodically during the mission. It sat at the end of the boom so that it would not be contaminated by the spacecraft.

The Alpha Particle Spectrometer measured the alpha particles emitted by the surface, specifically by the gaseous radon-222 and radon-220. It was optimized to detect particles of energies of 4.7 to 9.1 MeV. It was built into the same casing as the X-ray Spectrometer.

The X-ray Spectrometer was used to investigate the properties of the upper layers of the lunar surface. As solar X-rays strike the surface, they cause the elements to fluoresce X-rays with well defined energies. The spectrometer could measure these and determine the composition of the lunar surface.

== Day 2 ==
Worden's first full day of solo operations was much the same as the previous day. He spent much of his time switching various experiments on and off and acquiring photographs of targets of interest on the lunar surface.

Even after one day in orbit, mission scientists were extremely pleased with the data returned by the spectrometers. However, due to orbital mechanics, they would only get data from the part of the Moon along their orbital track. During the six days in lunar orbit, the Moon only rotated about 20% and the spacecraft's orbit was only inclined by 26°. So only a small amount of the lunar surface was actually covered. Ideally for scientists, a mission would be placed in a polar orbit for a month, from where it could observe the entire lunar surface.

Lunar scientists were particularly interested in rocks that had higher concentrations of samarium, uranium, thorium, potassium and phosphorus. They gave these rocks the acronym KREEP (potassium (atomic symbol K), rare earth elements (REE), and phosphorus (P)). The gamma-ray spectrometer was designed to detect these types of rocks. They had been found at the Apollo 12 and Apollo 14 landing sites but not at the Apollo 11 site, which was about 1,000 km to the east of the Apollo 14 site. At the time of Apollo 15, scientists were interested in whether KREEP rocks were found all over the Moon or just in the region around 12 and 14. It is believed that KREEPs represent the last chemical remnants of the "magma ocean" after the lunar crust formed. KREEPs floated to the surface because their component elements are "incompatible", that is, they did not incorporate into compact crystal structures. In the late 1990s, results from Lunar Prospector's gamma ray spectrometer shows that KREEP-containing rocks are concentrated in the Mare Imbrium rim, the near side maria and highlands near Imbrium and the Mare Ingenii South Pole-Aitken basin and are distributed at a lower level in the highlands. The distribution seen by Lunar Prospector supports the idea that the impact which formed Mare Imbrium excavated KREEP-rich rocks and ejected them over the Moon, and the South Pole-Aitken basin impact also exposed KREEP-rich material.

One of the more personal things that Worden did during the mission was how he greeted Mission Control after reappearing from behind the Moon on each orbit. He and Farouk El-Baz had decided to use the phrase "Hello Earth; Greetings from Endeavour" but in different languages, ranging from Arabic to Spanish.

Problems developed with the Panoramic Camera. It used what was called a "V-over-H" sensor to measure the motion of the surface beneath it, from which is worked out how to move the camera to compensate for this motion. From the beginning this sensor had begun to play up, with only about 80% of images being without some blurring. It would not affect the camera greatly but was an annoyance.

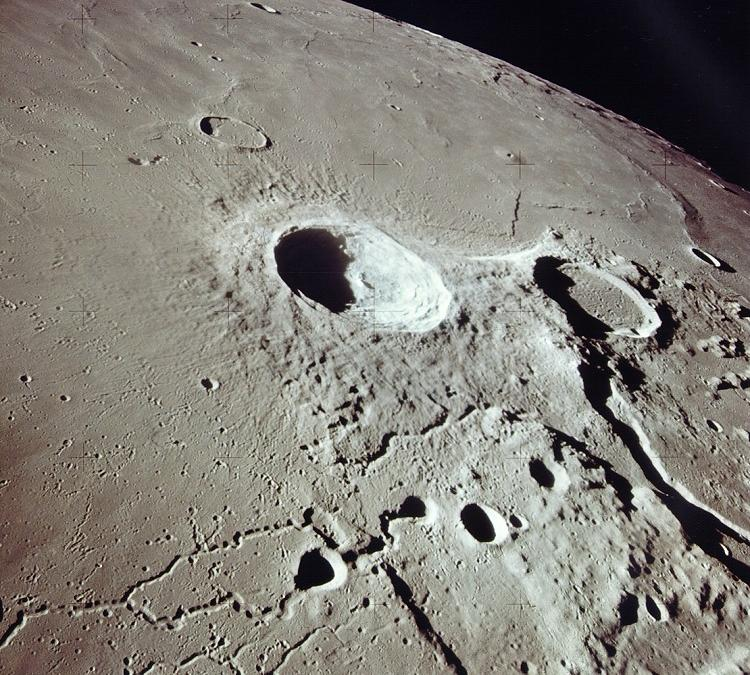
In the center is Aristarchus and to its right is Herodotus. This photograph was taken on the second to last day, after the LM had redocked.

One of the targets of particular interest was the crater Aristarchus. In 1963, Jim Greenacre saw a reddish glow in the region. This was confirmed by four other observers including the then-director of the Lowell Observatory. Apollo 15 was the first crewed spacecraft to pass over the site. At the time it was not in direct sunlight but was illuminated by light reflected off the Earth — Earthshine. Worden did not see any glows, even though he described it as being "so bright in Earthshine, it's almost as bright, it seems like, as it is in sunshine. Very, very bright crater."

A regular task for the crew was exercise. It had been found on even the short duration flights, the crews became weakened due to the lack of gravity. The Exergym was a bungee cord that the crew would pull on to keep their shoulders and arms strong. Worden would also fold away the center couch and jog on the stop. Other exercises the crew found that they could do were to position themselves between the bulkhead and the couches and to do kneebends against their arms. During the Technical Debrief at the end of the mission, the crew said that although it was planned for all of them to do equal amounts of exercise, Worden did twice as much, as he was in weightlessness for the entire mission, while the other two would spend three days in the one-sixth gravity of the Moon.

During a pass over the Littrow region, Worden reported seeing "small, almost irregular shaped cones", which he said looked like cinder cones. This observation would become one of the main reasons for going there on Apollo 17. It would turn out that one of these 'cinder cones' was just an impact crater, when visited by Gene Cernan and Harrison Schmitt on Apollo 17 and that what in fact he was seeing were young craters with dark ejecta blankets. Evidence did emerge for volcanic activity at Shorty when orange soil was found there. This was composed of orange glass beads which were sprayed while molten from a fumarole or lava fountain 3.64 billion years ago.

== Day 3 ==
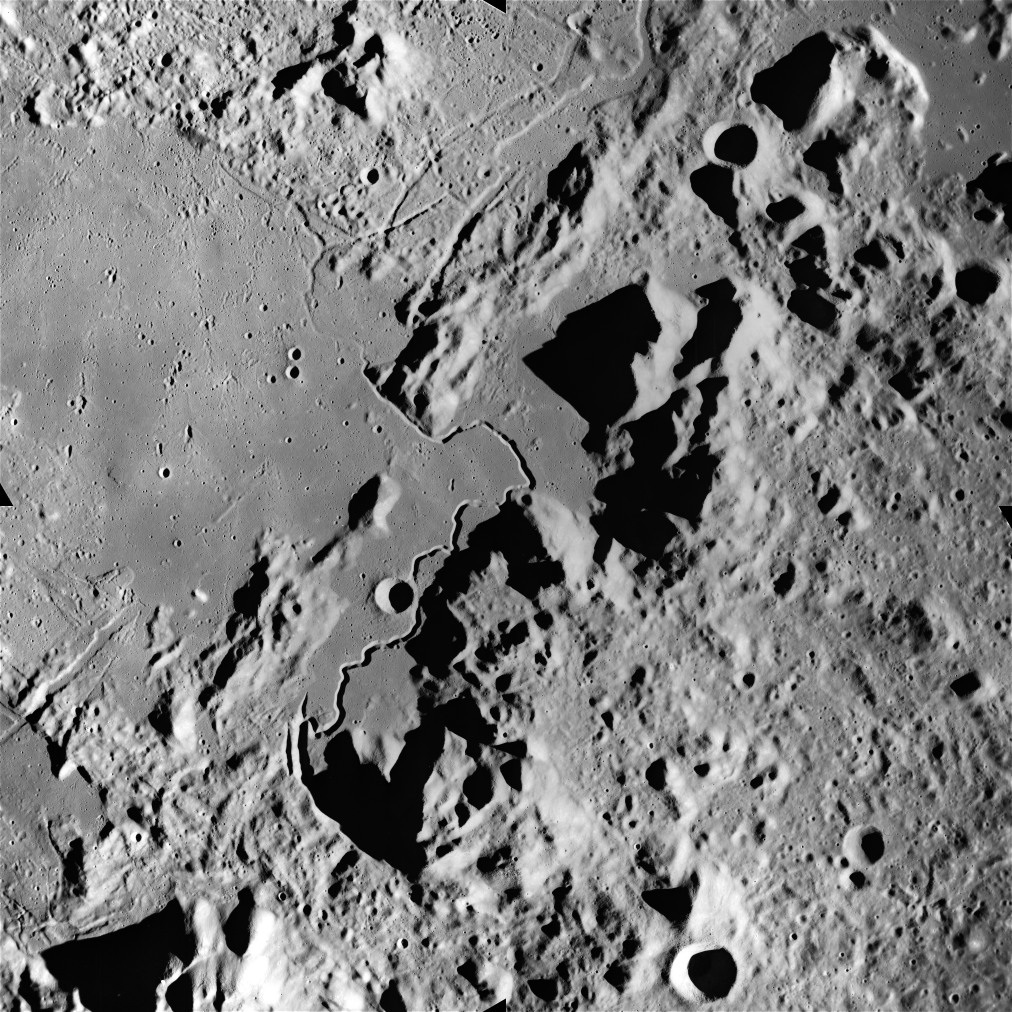
Hadley-Apennine area as seen from the Mapping Camera. The mountain in the center is Mons Hadley Delta.

During the third day solo in lunar orbit, Worden began to have some problems with the Mass Spectrometer. This was located on the end of a boom that is deployed and retracted periodically throughout the mission. Frequently instruments in the CM were indicating that it had failed to retract. To get it to retract properly he had to cycle the retract/deploy switch several times. During the EVA on the return to Earth, he inspected the housing and found that guide pins were barely coming through the guide slot. Further it was found that the problems with retraction always occurred after the housing had been in the shadow of the spacecraft, but would retract fully after being in sunlight. This was caused by the motor stalling out, implying that the parts of the boom were being deformed by thermal expansion. To stop this occurring, several modifications were made to the instruments used on Apollo 16 and Apollo 17.

146 hours after launch, Worden position the spacecraft so that he could take photographs of the region of the 'sky' opposite the Sun, in hopes of seeing the gegenschein. This faint glow is thought to be caused by tiny particles in the interplanetary medium reflecting light back at the observer. Due to aiming errors, no useful data was returned. Other non-lunar targets were the zodiacal light and the corona of the Sun.

== Day 4 ==
The fourth solo day was an extremely busy one, for both crews. Scott and Irwin had a five-hour LEVA and for liftoff from the Moon. Worden would then have to perform a rendezvous and docking with the LM.

Before all of this, Worden had to perform a plane change burn. During the three days, the orbital path of Endeavour had drifted so that it no longer passed over the landing site. As such, without this burn, rendezvous would have been complicated. This was an 18-second burn of the SPS, coming just after Endeavour reappeared from behind the Moon on its 45th orbit.

Worden then attempted to make a sighting of Falcon on the surface. This was done to provide accurate information of the new orbit of the CSM, to help with the upcoming rendezvous. However he had difficulty due to the Sun having risen higher, making the relief much less and the surface much brighter.
