= Bridge (crater) =

Crater on the Moon

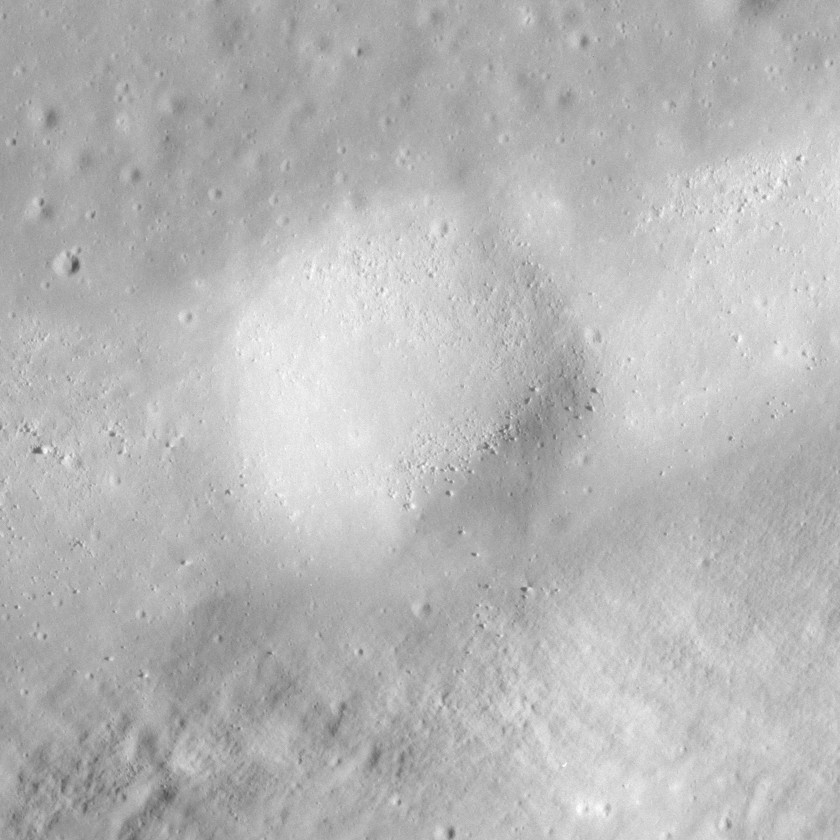
- Apollo 15 panoramic camera image
- Coordinates: 26.04°N 3.51°E
- Diameter: 690 m
- Eponym: Astronaut-named feature

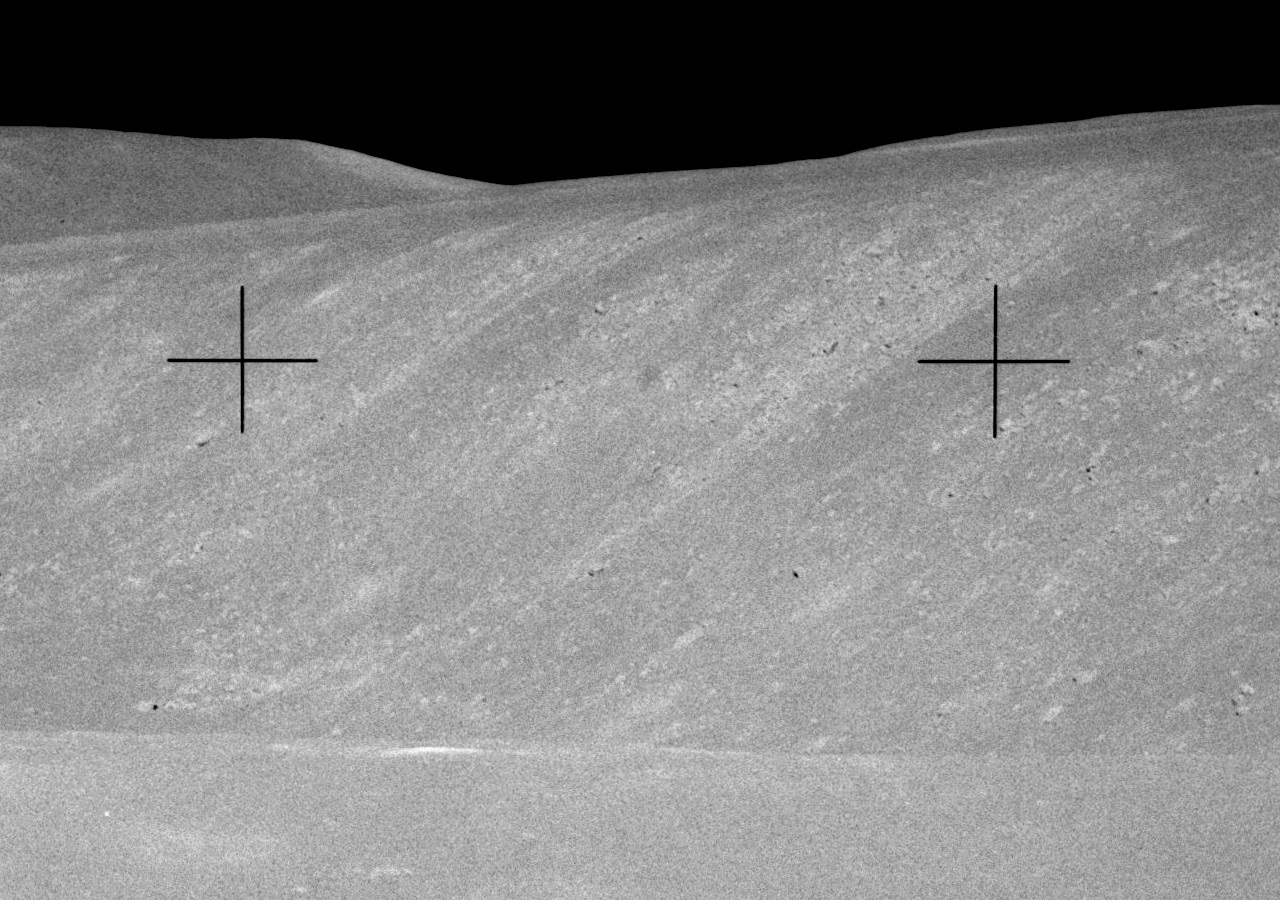
View of Bridge from near Elbow crater (Station 1).

Bridge is a feature on Earth's Moon, a crater in the Hadley–Apennine region.

The name of the crater was formally adopted by the IAU in 1973.

== Location ==
Bridge crater is located within Hadley Rille, also known as the Hadley-Apennine region, and its ejecta indeed forms a bridge of sorts across the rille. It lies at the base of Mons Hadley Delta and is approximately 4 km southwest of the Apollo 15 landing point.

=== Adjacent craters ===
The larger St. George crater is to the southeast and the smaller Elbow crater is due east.
