= Elbow (lunar crater) =

Crater on the Moon

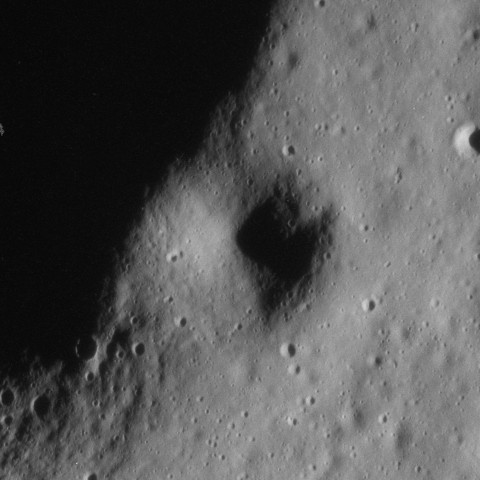
- Apollo 15 panoramic camera image
- Coordinates: 26.03°N 3.60°E
- Diameter: 340 m
- Eponym: Astronaut-named feature

Elbow is a feature on Earth's Moon, a crater in the Hadley–Apennine region. Astronauts David Scott and James Irwin visited the east rim of it in 1971, on the Apollo 15 mission, during EVA 1. The east rim of Elbow was designated Geology Station 1 of the mission. Geology Station 2 was to the southwest of the crater, up the slope of Mons Hadley Delta.

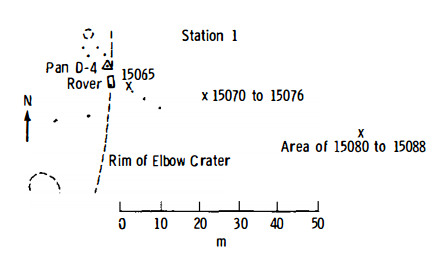
Planimetric map of Station 1 from the Apollo 15 Preliminary Science Report. X indicates sample locations, 5-digit numbers are LRL sample numbers, rectangle is lunar rover (dot indicates TV camera), black spots are large rocks, dashed lines are crater rims or other topographic features, and triangles are panorama stations.

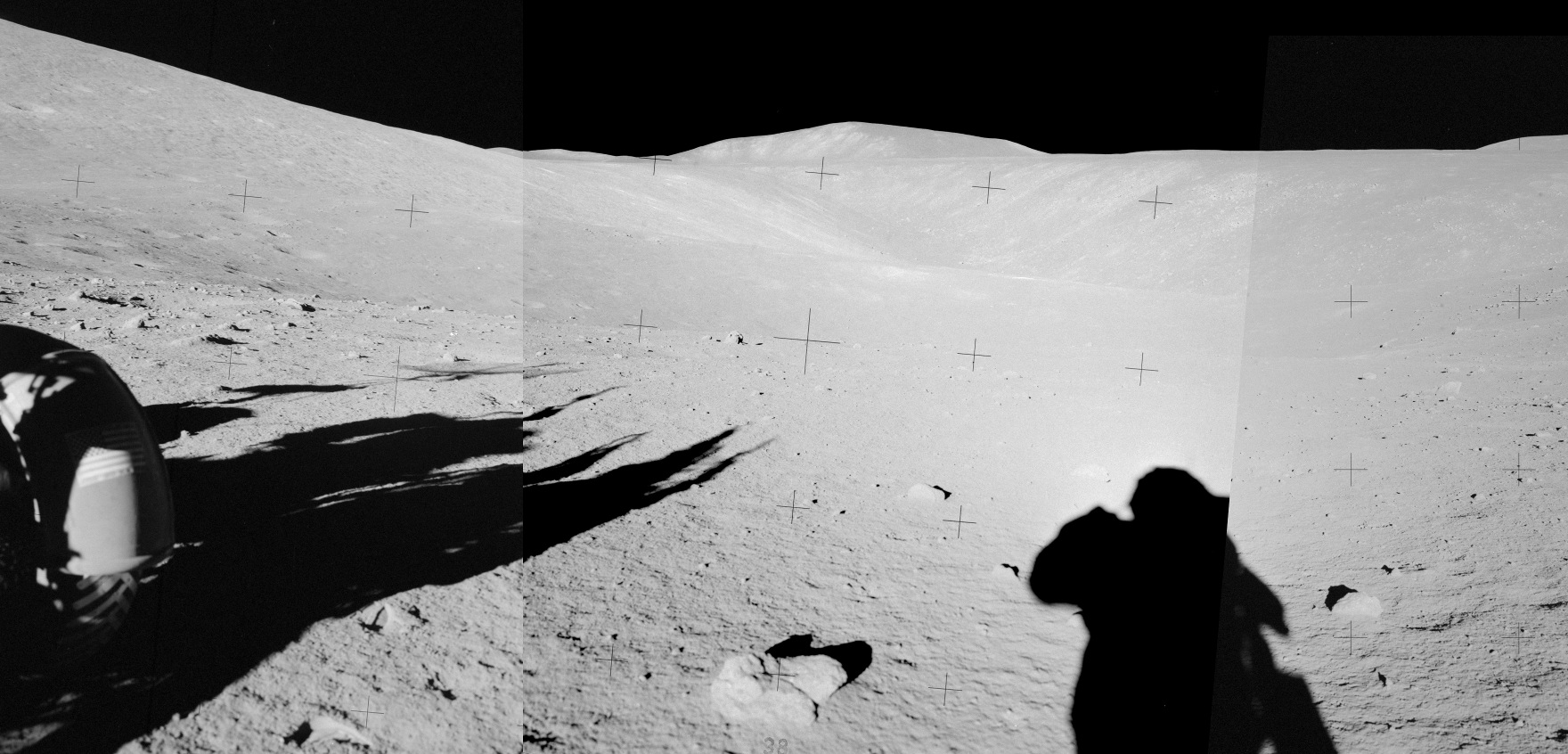
Panorama showing most of Elbow crater, taken at station 1. Hadley Rille is behind Elbow, and Bennett Hill is on the central horizon. Facing west at center.

Elbow is located on the edge of Hadley Rille, about 1 km northeast of the larger St. George crater, and about 3.2 km southwest of the Apollo 15 landing site itself.

The Apollo 15 Preliminary Science Report describes Elbow as follows:

Station 1 is located on the east flank of Elbow Crater, a 400-m-diameter crater that lies near the junction of the mare surface and the Apennine Front. Elbow Crater is a relatively old Copernican-age crater formed by an impact at a sharp bend in Hadley Rille. Elbow is approximately 0.5 km north of the foot of the Hadley Delta slope. Younger small craters occur on the Elbow Crater ejecta blanket. The surface is generally flat but hummocky in detail. The surface material is composed of fine-grained soil with sparse to common pebble-size and larger fragments. The larger fragments are locally concentrated around the young, fresh crater on the Elbow Crater ejecta blanket.

The crater was named by the astronauts after its location at a bend, or elbow, in Hadley Rille, and the name was formally adopted by the IAU in 1973.

== Samples ==
The following samples were collected from Elbow Crater (Station 1), as listed in Table 5-II of the Apollo 15 Preliminary Science Report. Sample type, lithology, and description are from Table 5-IV of the same volume.

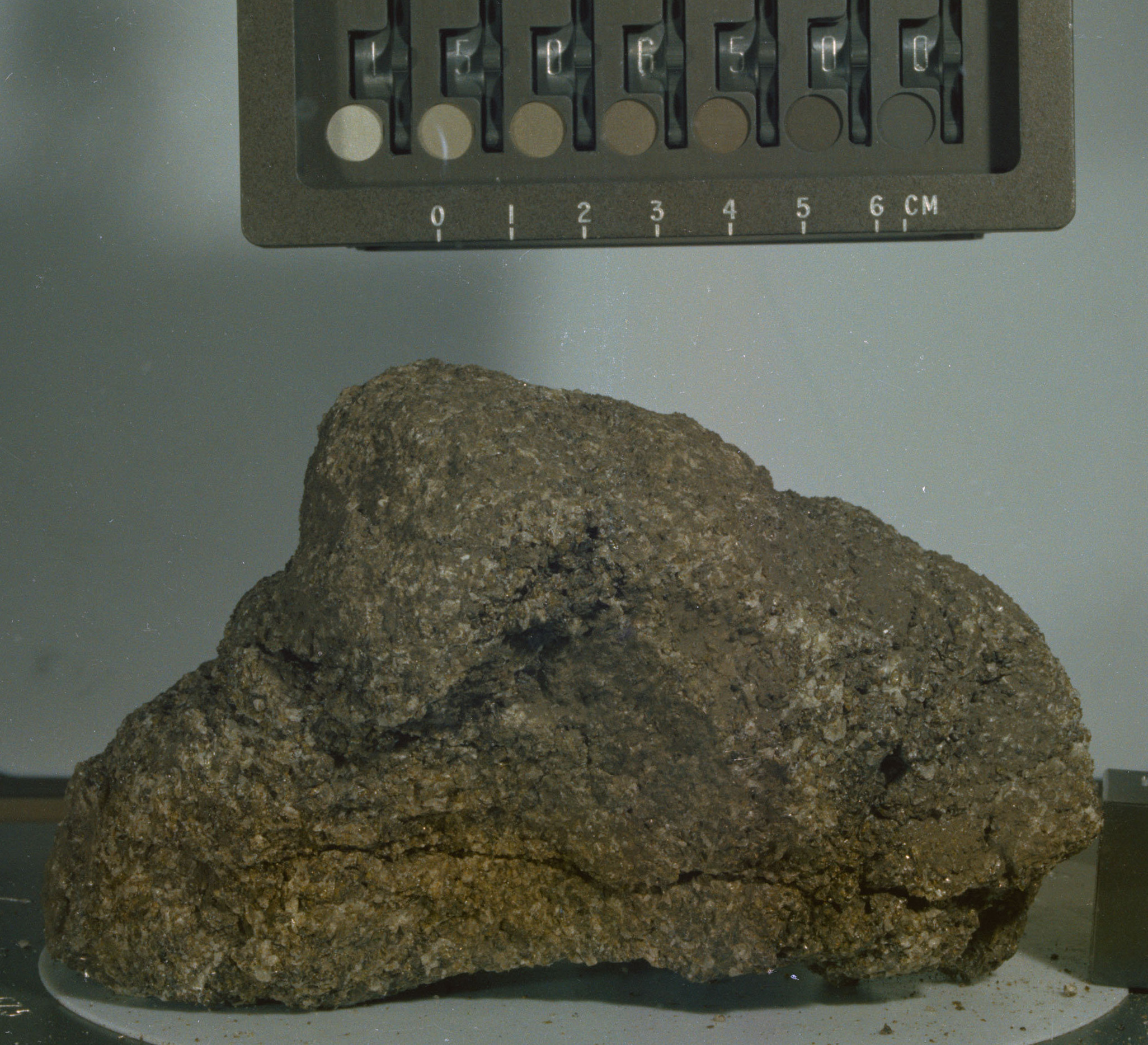
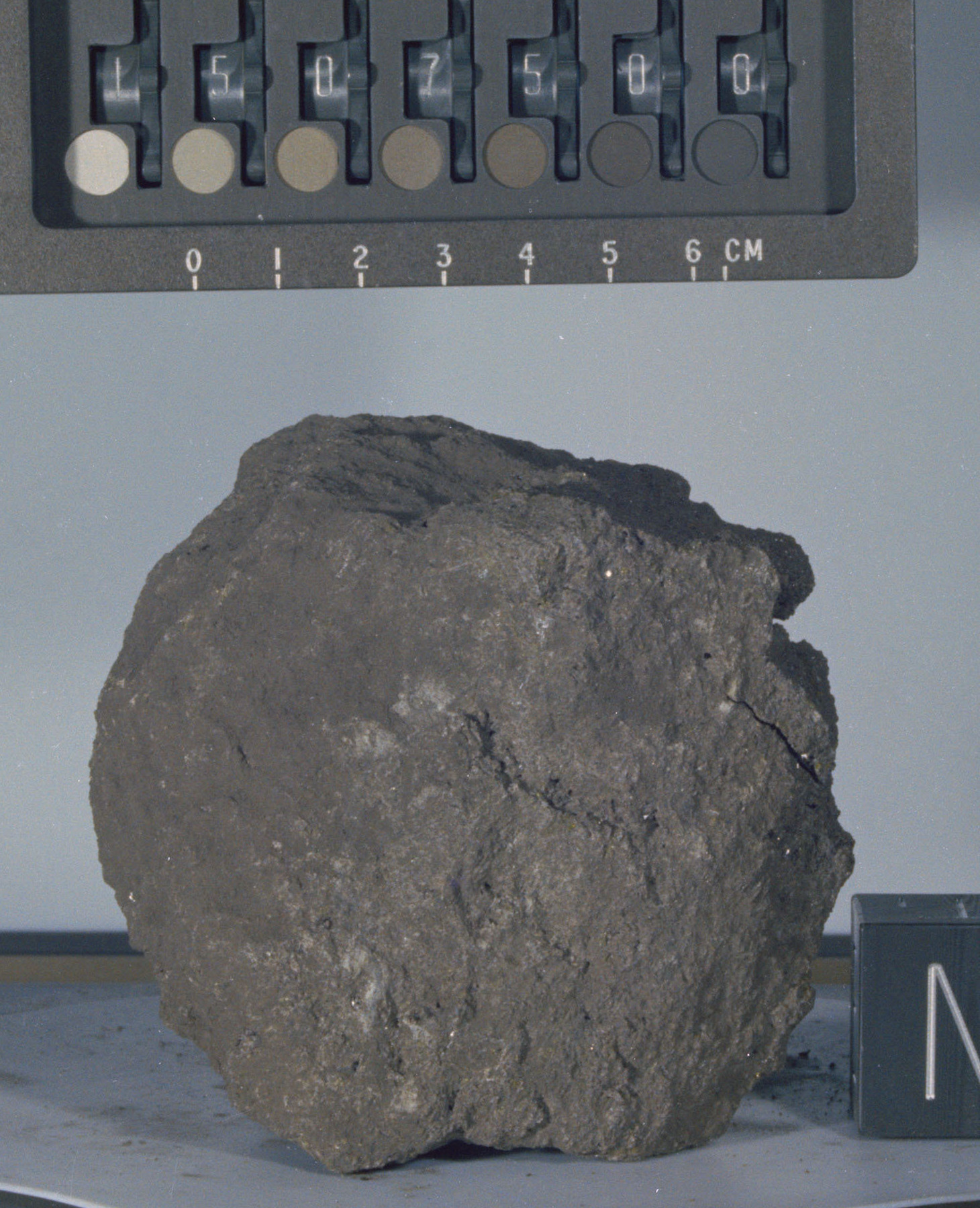
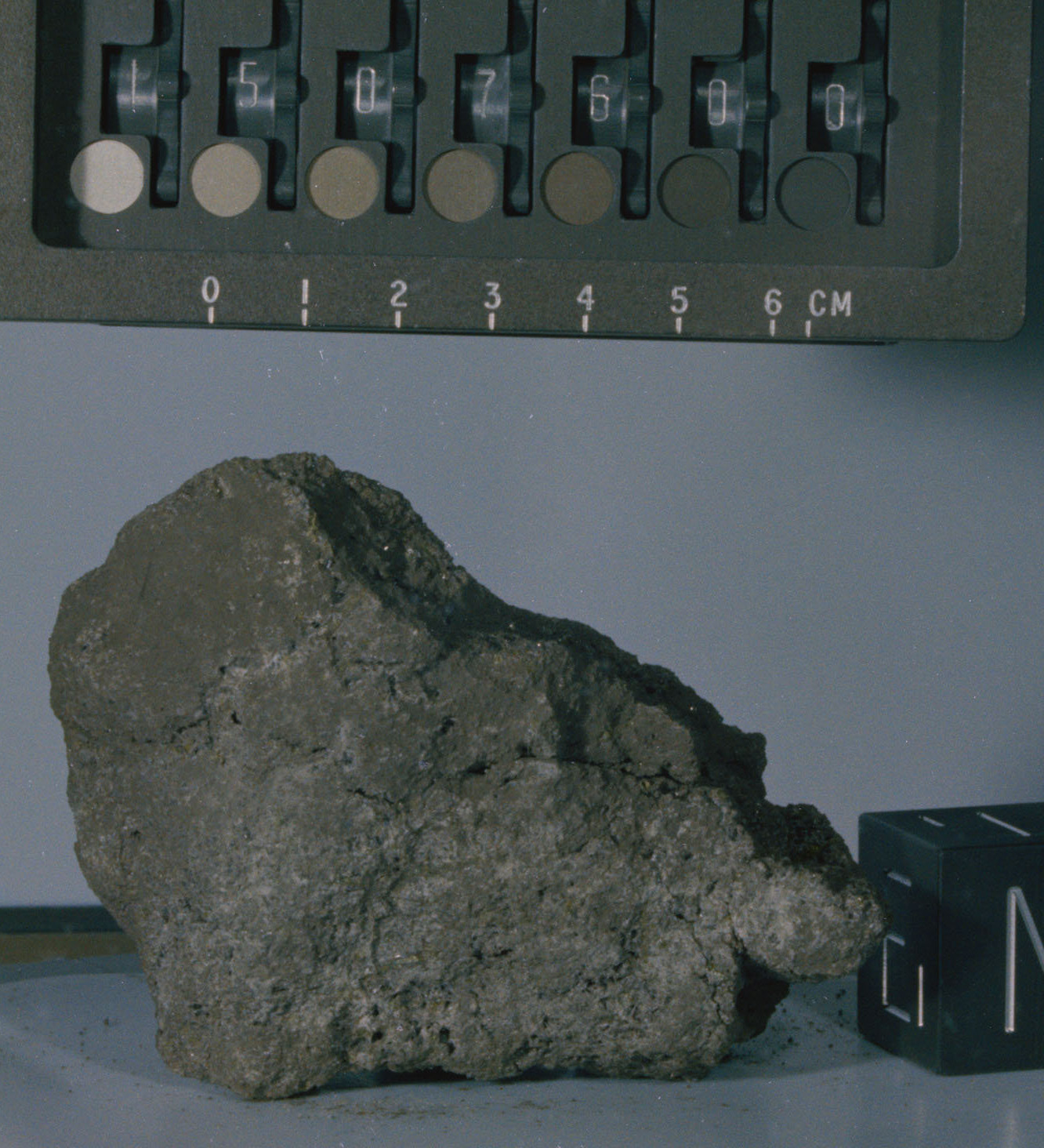
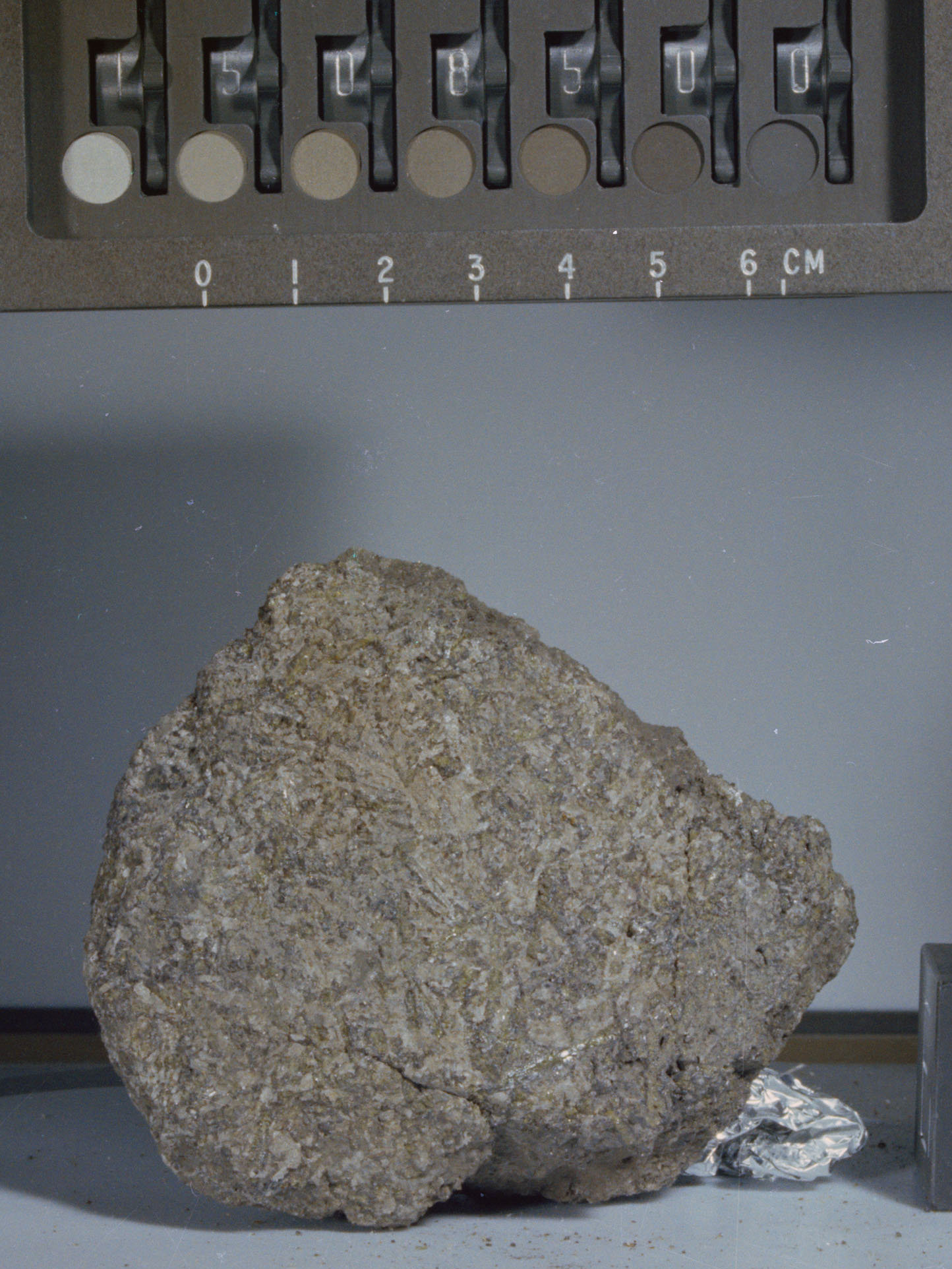
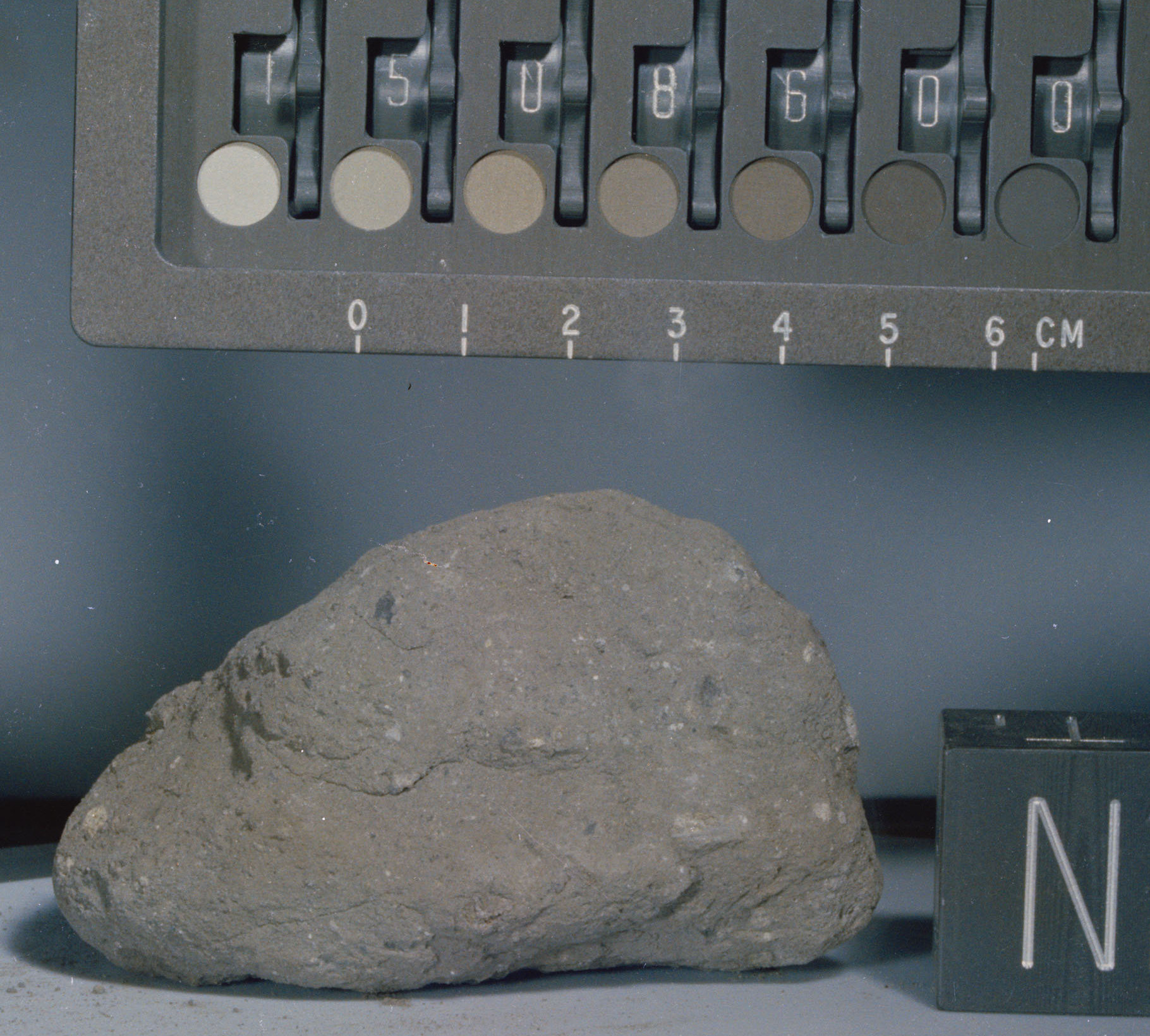
Sample	Photo	Lithology	Description
15065		basalt	A blocky, subangular, coarse-grained basalt. A zone approximately 2.5 to 6 cm wide at one end of the specimen is conspicuously more mafic than the rest of the rock. The contact between the two domains is irregular and moderately sharp. The light side of the rock appears to have a 3:1 ratio of mafic mineral to feldspar, and the dark side a ratio approximately 6:1 or 7:1. Irregular vugs to several millimeters across are concentrated in the dark domain.
15070 to 15074	-	soil	Soil sample
15075		basalt	A blocky, subangular, medium-grained basalt. Approximately 5 percent is vugs, to 3 mm across, that appear to be concentrated in a lens 1 by 3 cm.
15076		basalt	This sample is a blocky, angular, medium-grained basalt that closely resembles 15075. Approximately 5 percent is irregularly distributed vugs to 4 mm across. Plagioclase laths or plates appear to be alined.
15080 to 15084	-	soil	Fines consisting of soil scooped from beneath 15085, some soil that was described during collection as being caked on the bottom of 15085, and probably some material derived from the breccia sample 15086.
15085		basalt	The sample is a blocky, subangular, coarse-grained basalt approximately 3 to 5 percent vugs to a few millimeters across. The texture may be subophitic, contains plagioclase to 5 mm long.
15086		breccia	The sample is a blocky, subrounded, friable, fine breccia. Lithic clasts, comprising approximately 5 percent of the rock, are both leucocratic (dominant) and melanocratic. Leucocratic types include some basaltic fragments with brown pyroxene. Melanocratic types are very fine grained or glassy and dark gray. Clasts are seriate with 15 to 25 percent in the 0.5- to 1.0-mm size fraction.
15087	-	basalt	Probably a piece of 15085
15088	-	breccia	Probably a piece of 15086
