= St. George (crater) =

Crater on the Moon

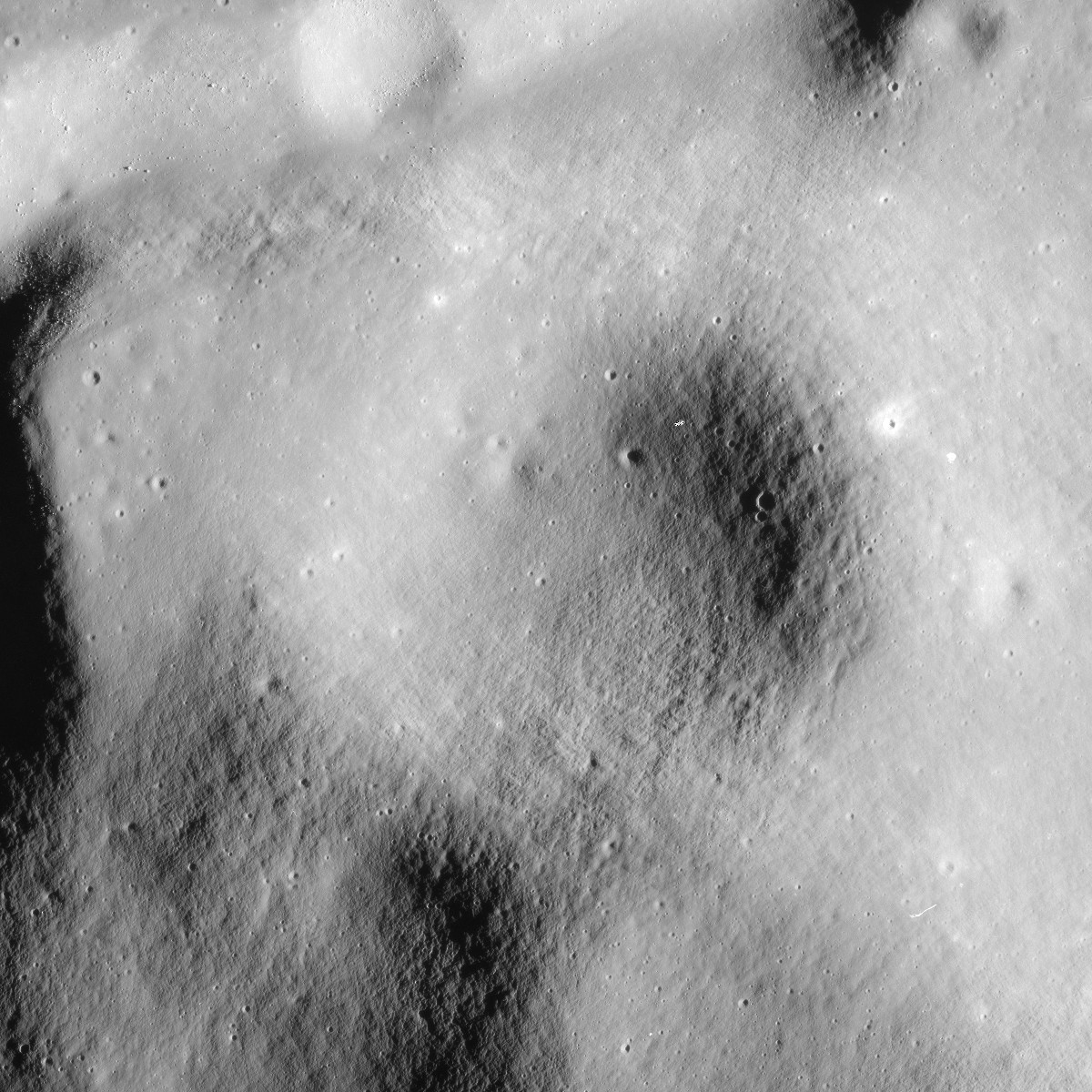
- Apollo 15 panoramic camera image
- Coordinates: 25.96°N 3.54°E
- Diameter: 2.42 km
- Formation: Upper Imbrian
- Eponym: Astronaut-named feature

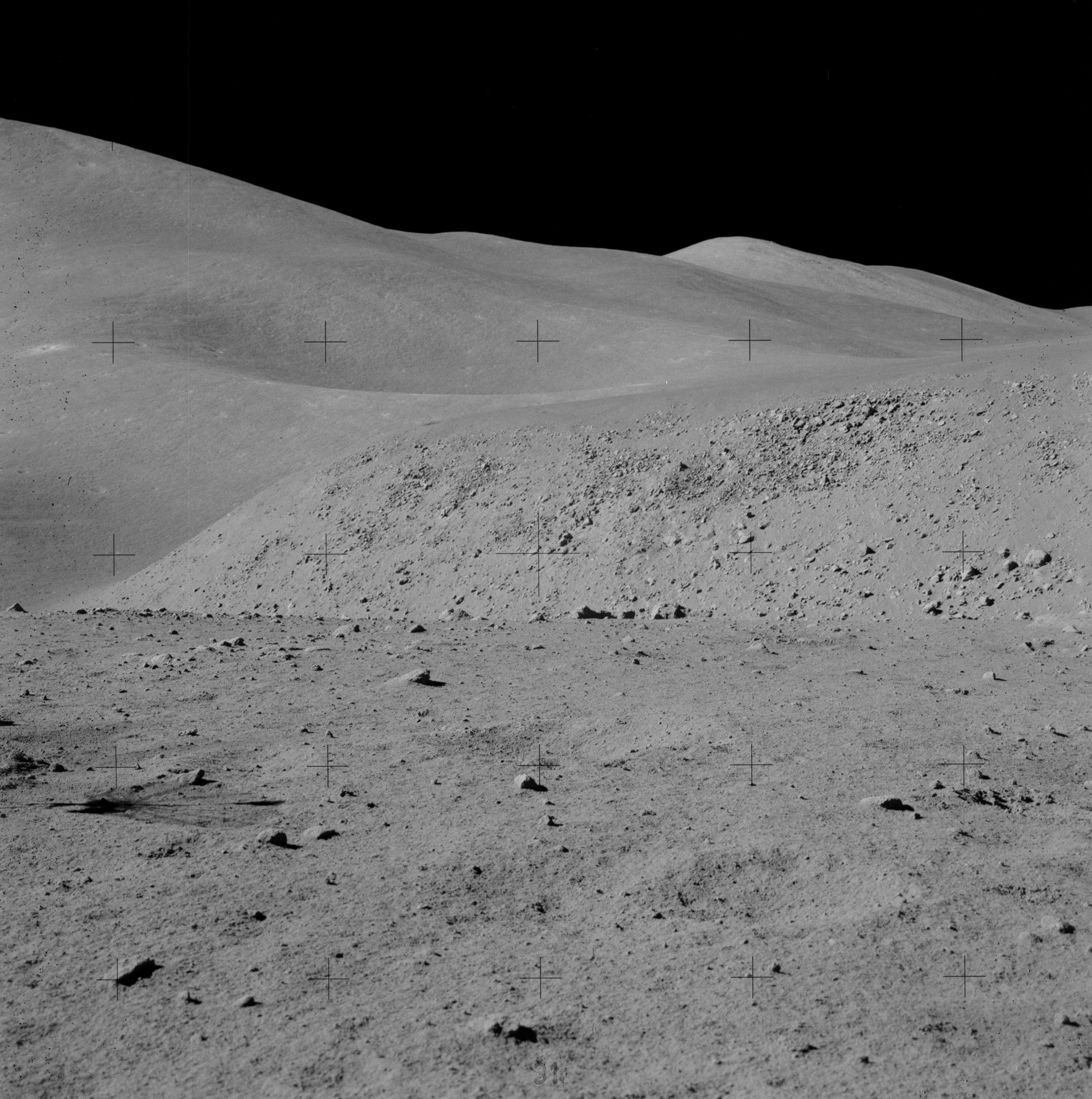
View of St. George (slightly above left of center) facing south from the rim of Hadley Rille (Geology Station 9)

St. George is a crater in the Hadley–Apennine region on Earth's Moon. Astronauts David Scott and James Irwin drove their rover onto what was suspected to be its ejecta blanket in 1971 on the Apollo 15 mission during EVA 1. They collected samples to the northeast of the crater, at Geology Station 2 of the mission.

St. George is on the west slope of Mons Hadley Delta and approximately 4 km southwest of the Apollo 15 landing point. Bridge crater is to the northwest and Elbow crater is to the northeast.

The name of the crater was formally adopted by the IAU in 1973.

St. George is of Upper (Late) Imbrian age.

== Station 2 ==
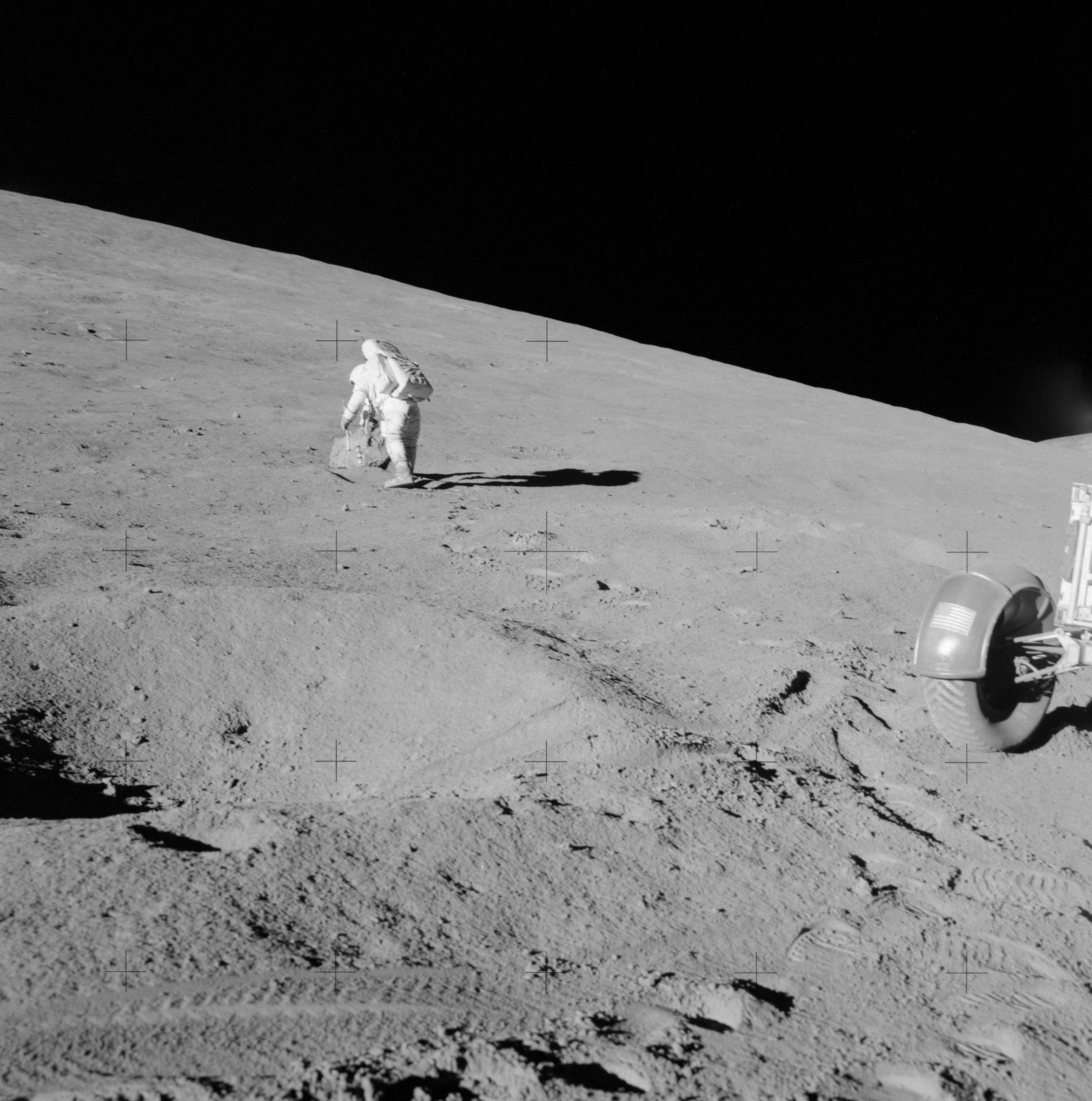
David Scott collecting samples from a boulder down the northeast slope from the rim of St. George

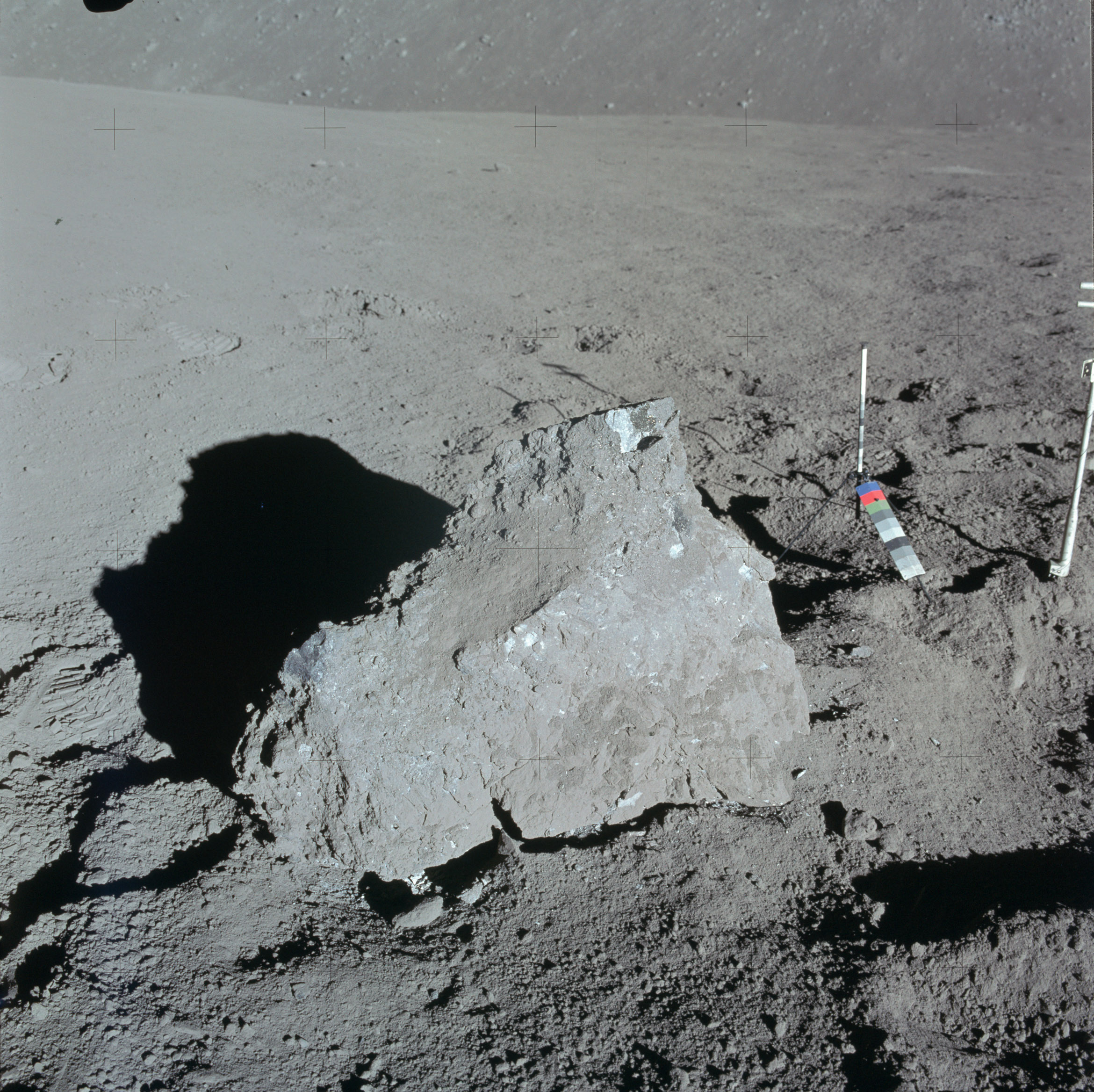
The boulder at Station 2

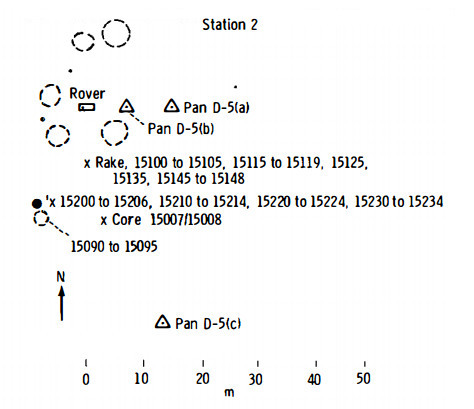
Station 2 map. X indicates sample locations, 5-digit numbers are LRL sample numbers, rectangle is lunar rover (dot indicates TV camera), black spots are large rocks, dashed lines are crater rims or other topographic features, and triangles are panorama stations.
