= Mons Hadley Delta =

Mountain on the Moon

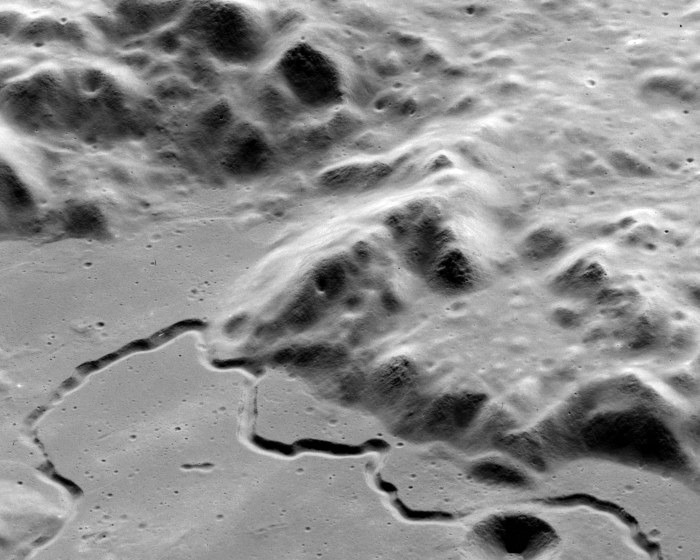
- Mons Hadley Delta from orbit, facing east, with the Apollo 15 landing site at left

Highest point
- Elevation: 8789 m (summit)
- Listing: Lunar mountains
- Coordinates: 25.72°N 3.71°E

Geography
- Location: the Moon

Mons Hadley Delta (δ) is a massif in the northern portion of the Montes Apenninus, a range in the northern hemisphere of the Moon adjacent to Mare Imbrium. It has a height of 3.6 km above the plains to the north and west.

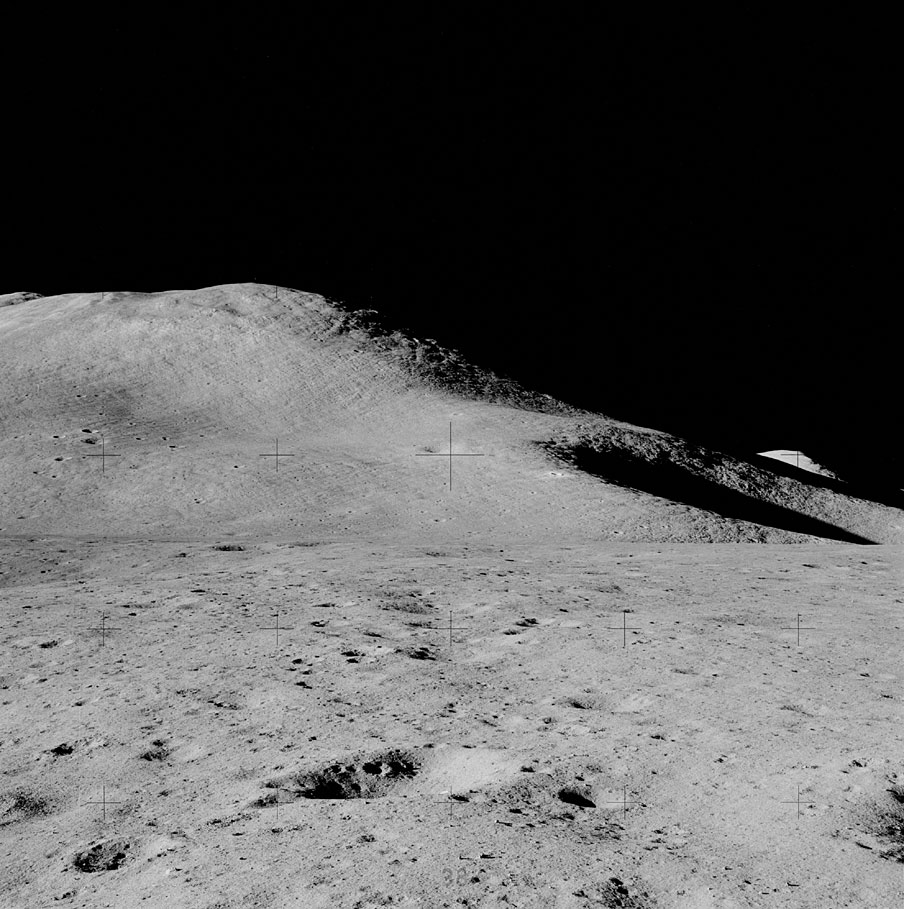
Mons Hadley Delta and St. George crater taken by Dave Scott during stand-up EVA of the Apollo 15 expedition on July 30, 1971

To the north of this mountain is a valley that served as the landing site for the Apollo 15 expedition. To the northeast of this same valley is the slightly larger Mons Hadley peak with a height of about 4.6 km. To the west of these peaks is the sinuous Rima Hadley rille.

These features were named after the English mathematician and inventor of the octant John Hadley.

On the Apollo 15 mission in 1971, the astronauts David Scott and James Irwin explored the lower reaches of the north slope of Mons Hadley Delta, and collected many samples which were returned to earth. Station 2 was near St. George crater, and Stations 6, 6A, and 7 were at or near Spur crater. They found the famous "Genesis Rock", sample 15415, at Spur. A clast of anorthosite within this rock is likely to be a piece of the primordial lunar crust.

== See also ==
- List of mountains on the Moon
