= Genesis Rock =

Rock retrieved from the Moon in 1971

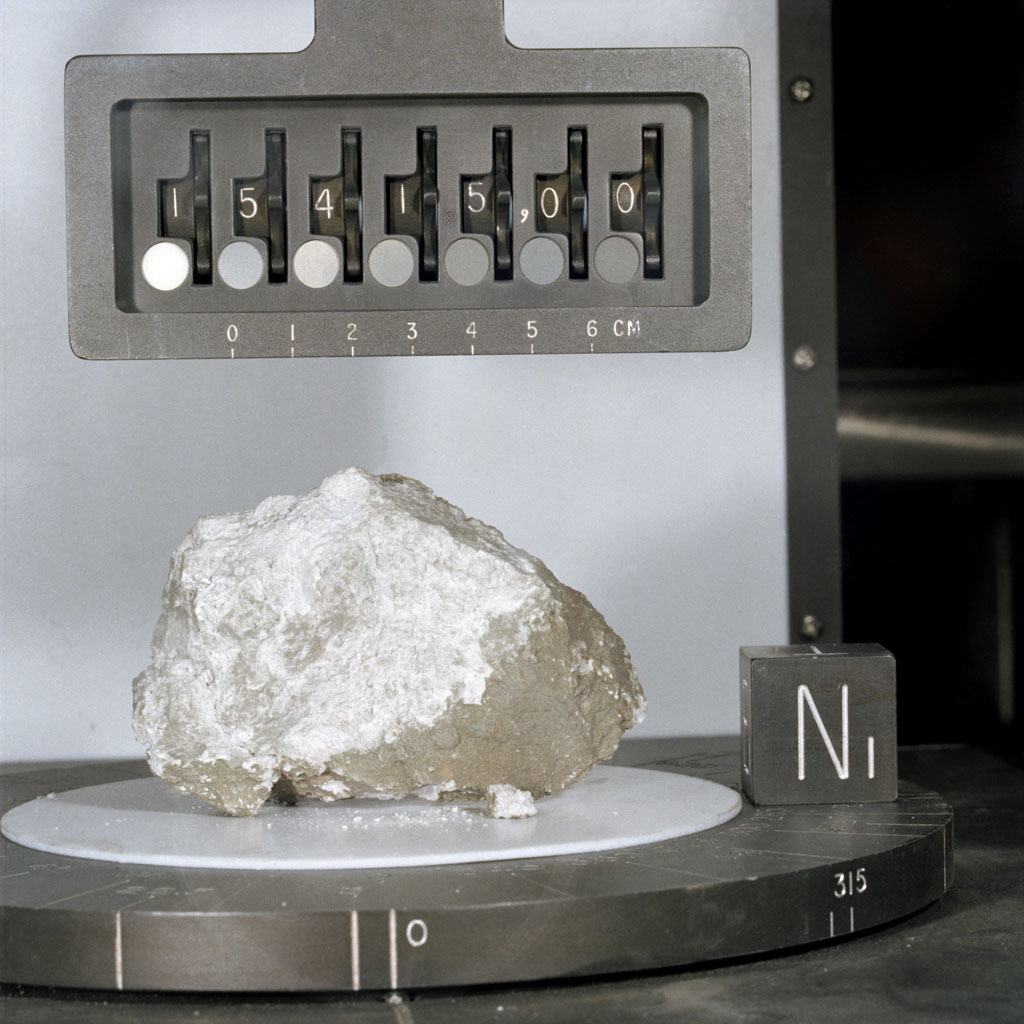
The Genesis Rock

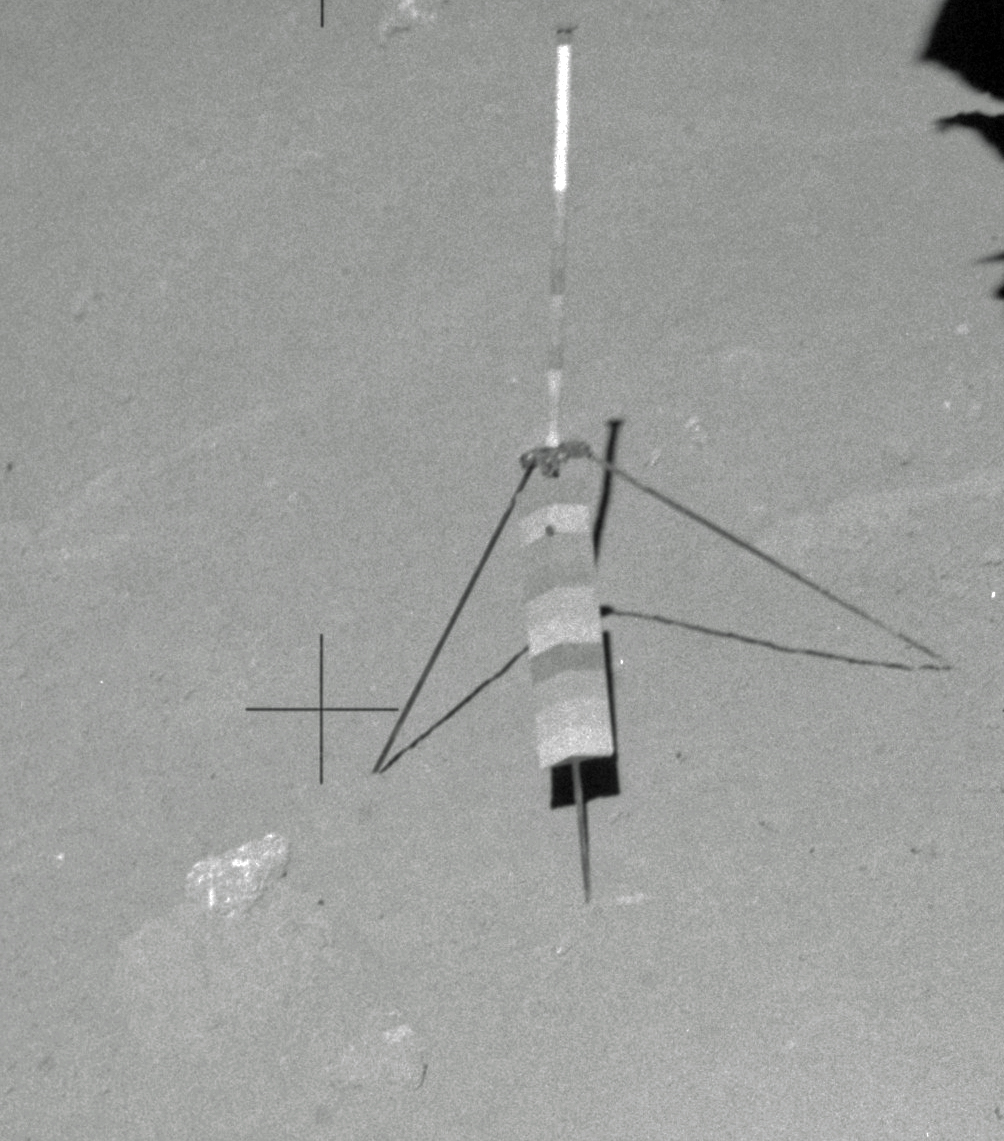
The Genesis Rock on the lunar surface prior to sampling (left of the gnomon, which was used for scale in the photos)

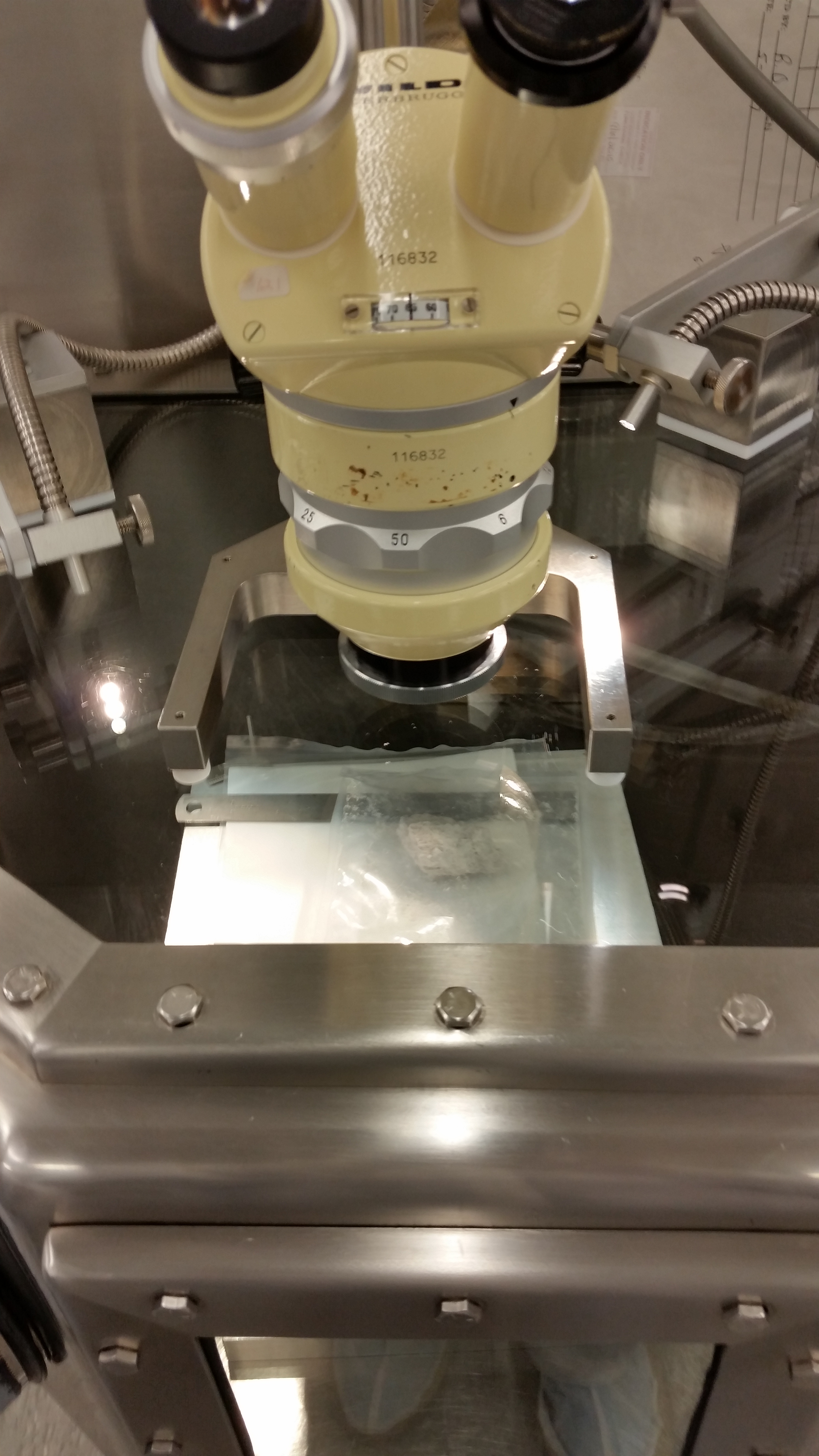
The Genesis Rock on display at the Lunar Sample Laboratory Facility

The Genesis Rock (sample 15415) is a sample of Moon rock retrieved by Apollo 15 astronauts James Irwin and David Scott in 1971 during the second lunar EVA, at Spur crater on Earth's Moon. It has a mass of c. 270 grams (4,200 grains), and is stored at the Lunar Sample Laboratory Facility in Houston, Texas.

== Rock ==
Chemical analysis of the Genesis Rock indicated it is an anorthosite, composed mostly of a type of plagioclase feldspar known as anorthite. The rock was formed in the early stages of the Solar System, at least 4 billion years ago.

It was originally thought they had found a piece of the Moon's primordial crust, but later analysis initially showed that the rock was only 4.1 ± 0.1 billion years old, which is younger than the Moon itself, and was formed after the Moon's crust had already solidified. Research has shown that the Genesis Rock is not the oldest sample recovered from the moon, with sample 14321 (retrieved during the Apollo 14 mission) surpassing it. It is still an extremely old sample, formed during the Pre-Nectarian period of the Moon's history. Dating of pyroxenes from other lunar anorthosite samples gave a samarium–neodymium age of crystallization of 4.46 billion years. Other research methods approximate the age of the rock to be between 4 and 5 billion years old.

The discovery of the Genesis Rock

== See also ==
- Apollo 15 operations on the Lunar surface
- Hadley–Apennine
- Lunar sample displays
- Stolen and missing Moon rocks
