= James Irwin =

American astronaut and lunar explorer (1930–1991)

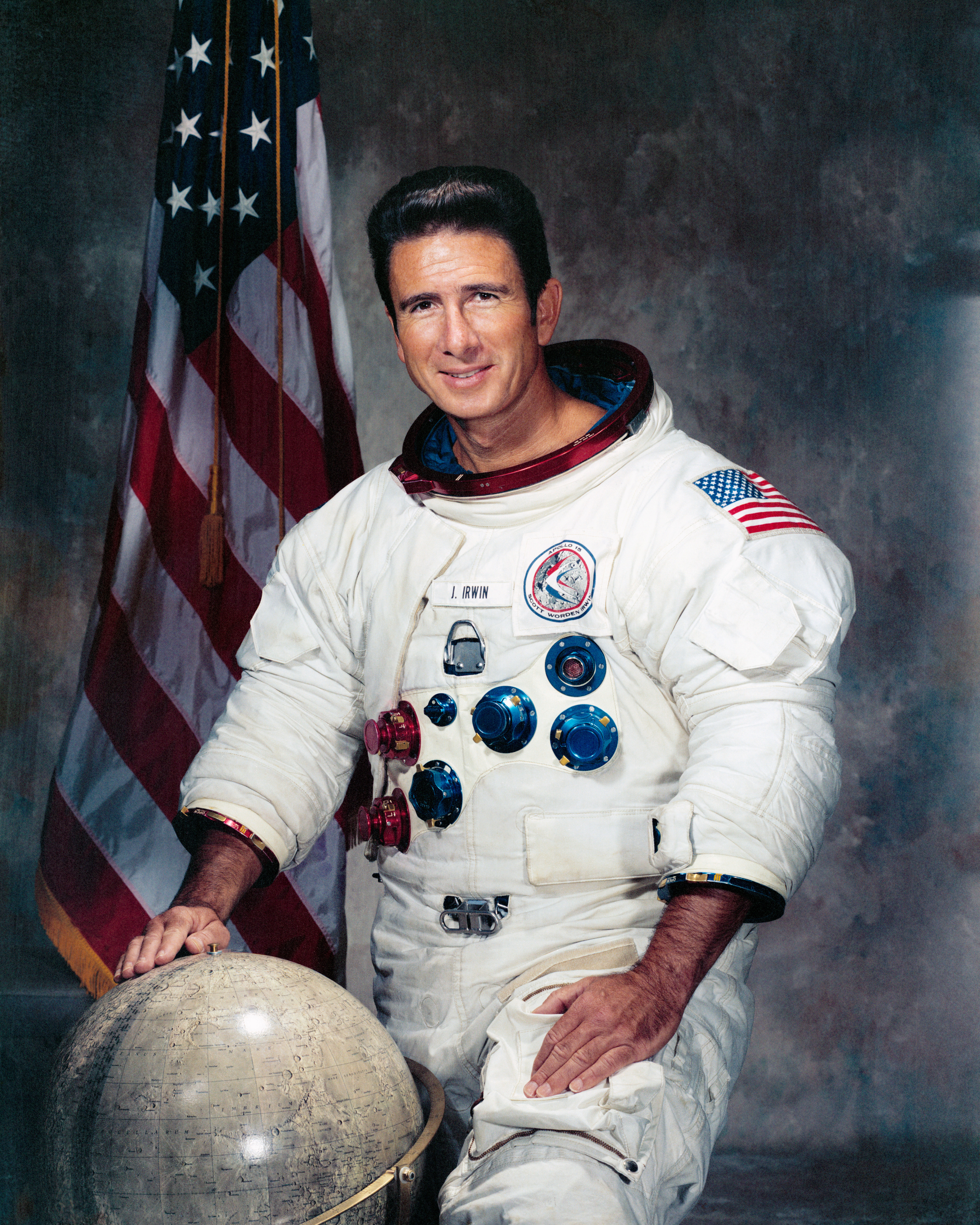
- Irwin in 1971
- Born: James Benson Irwin; March 17, 1930; Pittsburgh, Pennsylvania, U.S.
- Died: August 8, 1991 (aged 61); Glenwood Springs, Colorado, U.S.
- Resting place: Arlington National Cemetery
- Education: United States Naval Academy (BS); University of Michigan (MS)
- Spouse: Mary Ellen Monroe (m. 1959)
- Children: 5
- Awards: NASA Distinguished Service Medal
- Space career

NASA astronaut
- Rank: Colonel, USAF
- Time in space: 12d 7h 12m
- Selection: NASA Group 5 (1966)
- Total EVAs: 4; 3 EVAs on the Moon; 1 EVA stand-up
- Total EVA time: 18h 35m
- Mission: Apollo 15
- Retired: July 31, 1972

James Benson Irwin (March 17, 1930 – August 8, 1991) was an American astronaut, aeronautical engineer, test pilot, and a United States Air Force pilot. He served as Lunar Module pilot for Apollo 15, the fourth human lunar landing. He was the 8th person to walk on the Moon.

== Early life and education ==
James Benson Irwin was born March 17, 1930, in Pittsburgh, Pennsylvania, to James William Irwin, a U.S. Army veteran of World War I, and Elsa Mathilda Irwin (née Strebel). Irwin's paternal grandparents emigrated to the U.S. from Altmore Parish in Pomeroy, County Tyrone, Ireland (now Northern Ireland) around 1859.

In 1941, Irwin lived at 6006 Grand Boulevard in New Port Richey, Florida, and attended Pierce Elementary School (today the site of the New Port Richey Public Library and City Hall). While he was in the sixth grade, Irwin was also enrolled in seventh grade classes at Gulf High School due to his advanced aptitude. He is listed as a seventh grader in the 1942 Gulf High School yearbook. Throughout his life, Irwin frequently returned to New Port Richey, where he was a member of and attended the First Baptist Church.

At about the age of 12, he informed his mother about his desire to go to the Moon, letting her know that he might be the first person to do so (he ended up being the eighth). He graduated from East High School in Salt Lake City, Utah, in 1947. He received a Bachelor of Science degree in naval science from the United States Naval Academy in 1951, and Master of Science degrees in aeronautical engineering and instrumentation engineering from the University of Michigan in 1957.

He received initial flight training at Hondo Air Base and follow-up training at Reese Air Force Base, near Hondo and Lubbock, Texas, respectively. He graduated from the Air Force Experimental Flight Test Pilot School (Class 60C) in 1961, and the Aerospace Research Pilot School in 1963 (Class IV). Prior to joining NASA, he was chief of the Advanced Requirements Branch at Headquarters Air Defense Command. During his time in the United States Air Force, he received the Air Force Distinguished Service Medal and two Air Force Commendation Medals. He also received an Air Force Outstanding Unit Award while with the 4750th Training Wing.

Irwin was also a developmental test pilot for the Lockheed YF-12, the Mach 3 fighter-interceptor variant which preceded the SR-71 Blackbird. His first flight of that aircraft was on the day that one of his five children was born.

In 1961, a student pilot that Irwin was training crashed the plane they were flying on a training mission. They both survived, but Irwin suffered compound fractures, amnesia, and nearly lost a leg. John Forrest, a U.S. Air Force orthopedic surgeon, was instrumental in preventing the amputation of Irwin's leg.

During his military service, he accumulated more than 7,015 hours flying time, of which 5,300 hours were in jet aircraft.

== Personal life ==
Irwin was raised in a Christian household but stopped actively practicing the religion at age 10. He became a devout born-again Christian after returning from space. He was a Young Earth Creationist.

In 1952, Irwin married his first wife, who was a Catholic. The two had an unhappy marriage, worsened by his devotion to his work. By his own account, the marriage failed after two years due to his poor, borderline cruel treatment of her and he later stated that finding religion again made familial relationships much easier.

In 1959, Irwin married his second wife, the former Mary Ellen Monroe (born 1938). They were married for 32 years until his death in 1991.

Irwin had five children.

== NASA career ==
Irwin's Apollo 15 space suit

James Irwin was one of the 19 astronauts selected by NASA in April 1966. He was chosen as commander, with John S. Bull as lunar module pilot, for LTA-8, an environmental qualification test of the Apollo Lunar Module in a vacuum chamber at the Houston Space Environment Simulation Laboratory. He then served as a member of the astronaut support crew for Apollo 10, the first mission to carry the full Apollo stack to the Moon and the dry run for the first crewed Moon landing. Following that assignment, Irwin served as backup lunar module pilot for the second Moon landing mission, Apollo 12.

=== Apollo 15 ===
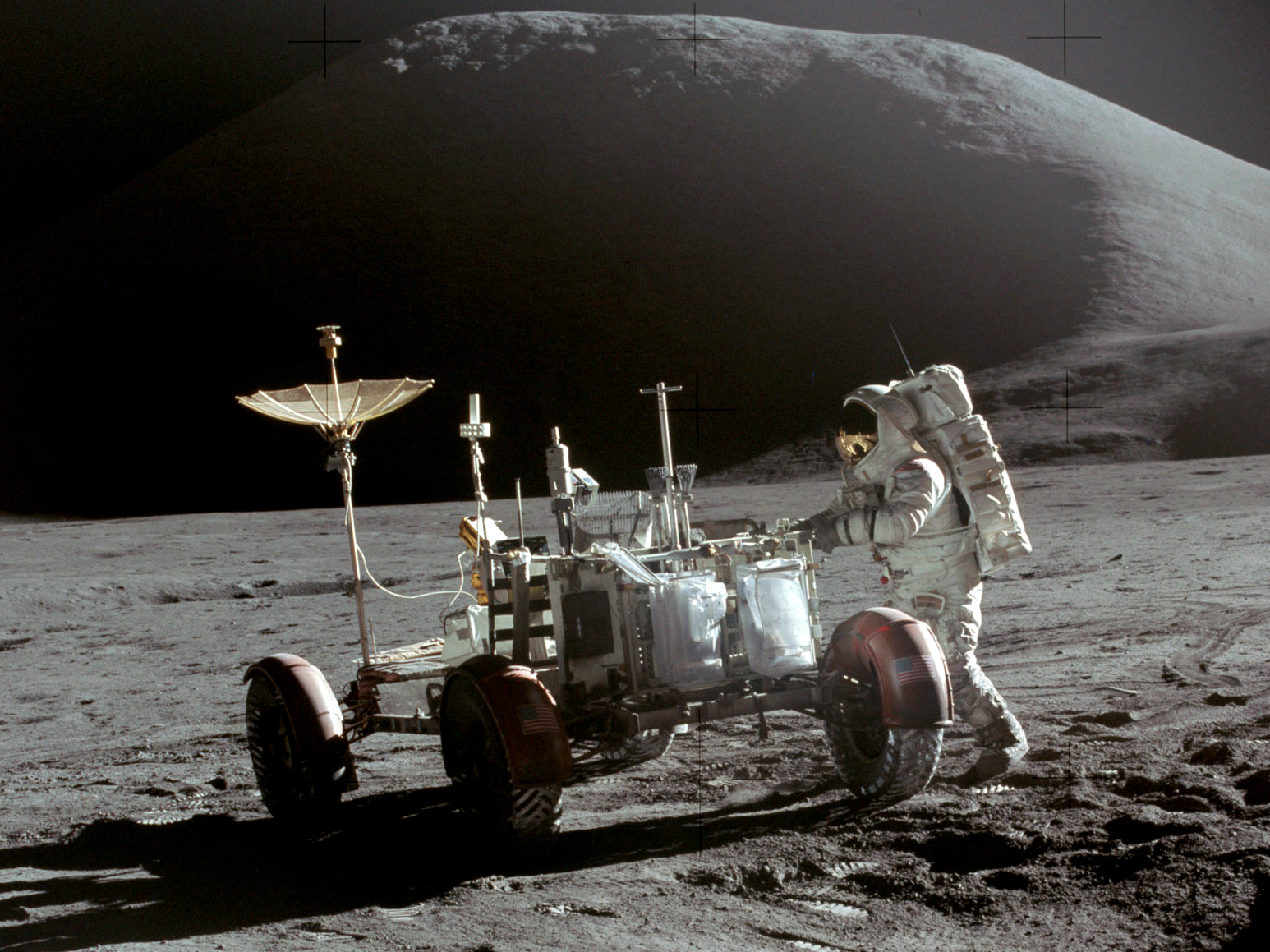
Irwin and the Lunar Roving Vehicle during Apollo 15

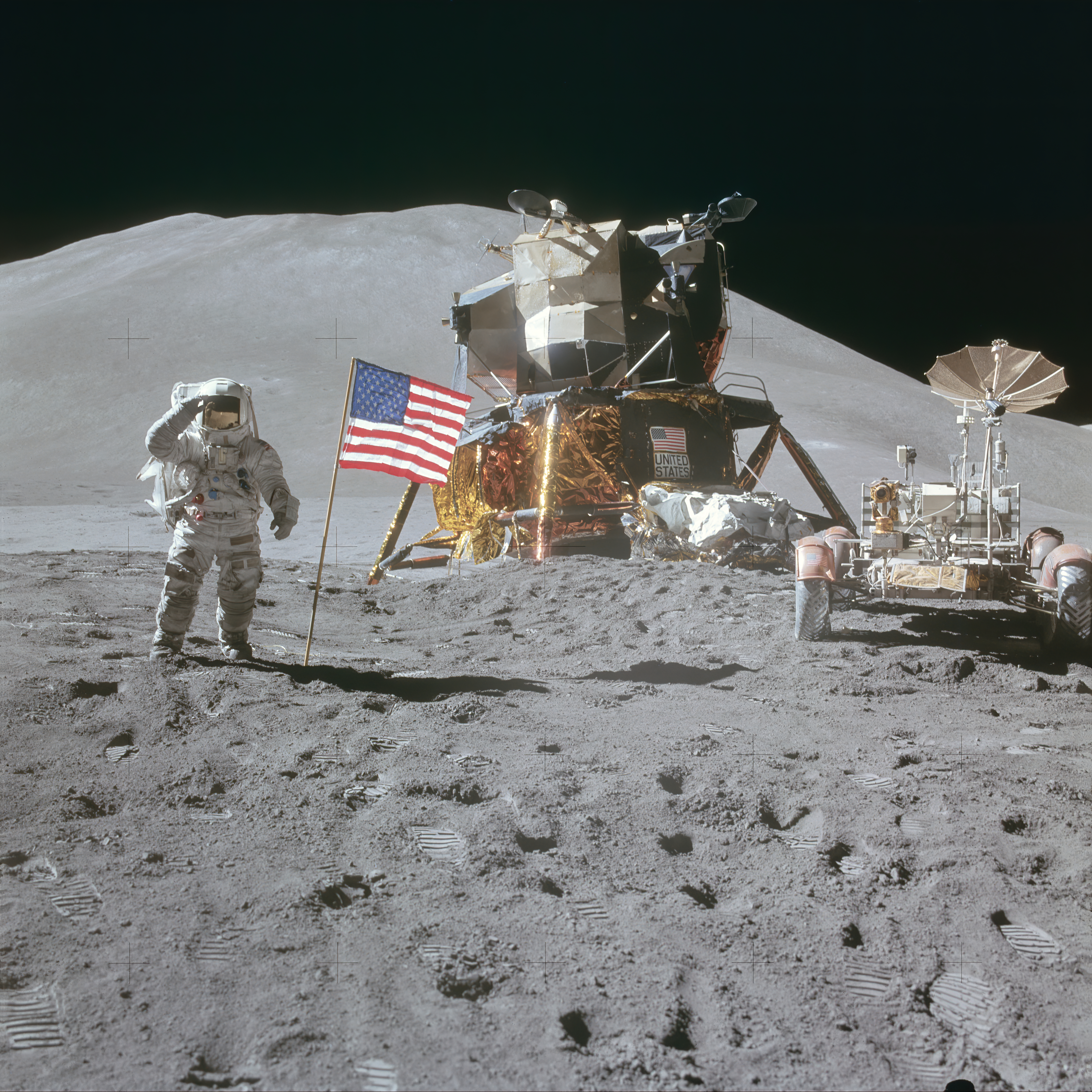
Irwin salutes the United States flag on the Moon on August 1, 1971

Between July 26 and August 7, 1971 – as the Apollo 15 lunar module pilot (LMP) – Irwin logged 295 hours in space. His extravehicular activity (EVA) on the Moon's surface amounted to 18 hours and 35 minutes of the mission time, an additional 33 minutes was used for Commander David R. Scott to do a stand-up EVA by opening the LM's docking hatch to survey the surroundings and take photographs. Irwin and Scott's mission was more science-based than previous missions, which meant that they received intensive geological training to meet the demanding nature of the J-Mission profile. This extra training is credited with allowing them to make one of the most important discoveries of the Apollo era, the Genesis Rock.

Apollo 15 landed in the Moon's Hadley-Apennine region, noted for its mountains and rilles. As a J-Mission, they would spend more time on the Moon than previous missions, to allow for three EVAs. As well, Irwin was the first automobile passenger on the Moon as Scott drove the Lunar Roving Vehicle (LRV) carried along for this mission in the lunar module (LM) Falcon's Descent Stage. Scott and Irwin's stay on the Moon was just under three days at 66 hours and 54 minutes.

Once the rendezvous procedure was completed between Falcon and the Endeavour CSM, Irwin and Scott were busy moving items like rock samples into the CSM and preparing the lunar module for final separation. During this intense period of work the earliest symptoms of a heart condition appeared. Both Scott and Irwin had been working with no sleep for 23 hours, during which they conducted a final moonwalk, performed the ascent from the lunar surface, rendezvoused with Endeavour, and encountered the problems that delayed the lunar module jettison maneuver. The astronauts' vital signs were being monitored back on Earth, and the flight surgeons noticed some irregularities in Irwin's heart rhythms. Irwin's heart had developed bigeminy. Charles Berry stated to Chris Kraft, deputy director of the Manned Spacecraft Center (MSC) at the time: "It's serious, [i]f he were on Earth. I'd have him in ICU being treated for a heart attack." However, Berry concluded that since Endeavour's cabin atmosphere was 100% oxygen when in space, Irwin was in the best of circumstances. Specifically, "In truth, ... he's in an ICU. He's getting one hundred percent oxygen, he's being continuously monitored, and best of all, he's in zero g. Whatever strain his heart is under, well, we can't do better than zero g."

During the post-trans-Earth injection (TEI) phase of the mission there was not much more for Irwin to do other than provide help with Al Worden's EVA to retrieve film magazines from the CSM's SIM bay, by donning a pressure suit and monitoring him. He was able to rest and apparently recover during the rest of the mission. The flight surgeons continued to monitor his EKG until splashdown, but his heart rhythm was normal. This incident was not discussed during the mission debriefing sessions, and the condition did not appear when he returned to Earth.

== Post-NASA career ==
After the return of Apollo 15 to Earth, it was discovered that without authority the crew had taken 398 commemorative first day covers to the Moon of which a hundred were then sold to a German stamp dealer. The profits of the sale were intended to be used to establish trust funds for the children of Apollo 15's crew. NASA had turned a blind eye to similar activities on earlier flights, but on this occasion the administration reprimanded the astronauts, and they never received any funds from the sales. Irwin had announced his intent to retire from the Air Force and resign from NASA prior to the reprimand. During a subsequent investigations by NASA, the Attorney General, and Congress, the astronauts surrendered the covers still in their possession; they were returned in 1983. Slate magazine opined that the action effectively exonerated the astronauts.

I felt the power of God as I'd never felt it before.

— Irwin, describing his experience during the Apollo 15 lunar mission.

By his own admission, Irwin was not a committed Christian during his years at NASA. After his retirement as a colonel in 1972, Irwin founded the High Flight Foundation. He spent the next 20 years as a "Goodwill Ambassador for the Prince of Peace", stating that "Jesus walking on the earth is more important than man walking on the moon". He said that his experiences in space had made God more real to him than before. Irwin and his wife stated that his Christian rebirth, which happened while he was in space, saved their marriage and made their lives much happier.

Beginning in 1973, Irwin led several expeditions to Mount Ararat, Turkey, in search of the remains of Noah's Ark. In 1982, he was injured during the descent and had to be transported down the mountain on horseback. In More Than Earthlings, Irwin wrote expressing his view that the Genesis creation narrative was real, literal history.

== Death ==
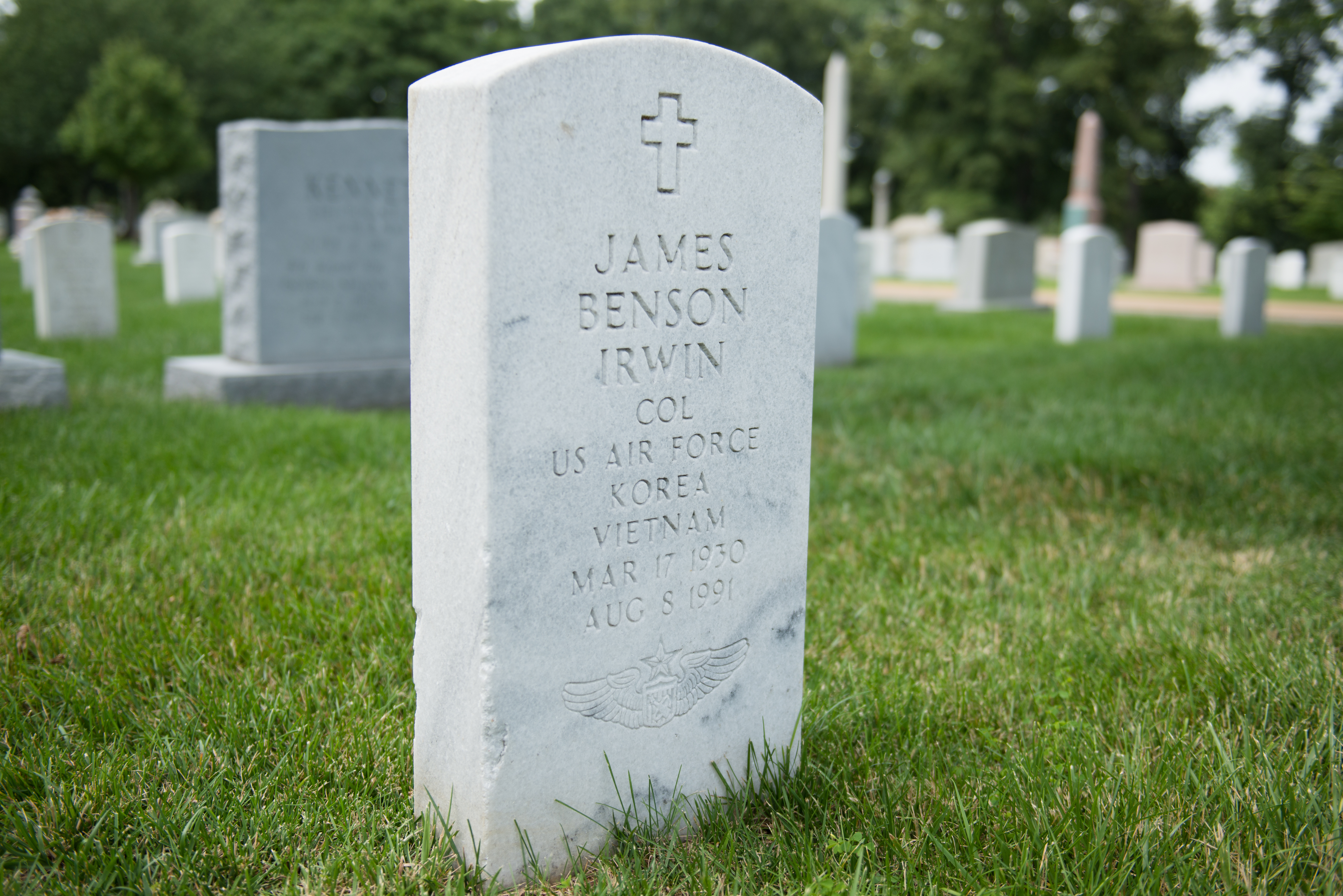
Grave of Irwin at Arlington National Cemetery

Irwin suffered three major heart attacks. One occurred less than two years after Apollo 15, when Irwin was 43 in 1973, while he was playing handball; he underwent an emergency triple bypass operation. Two months later he suffered a subsequent heart attack while skiing in Colorado. Irwin suffered another heart attack on June 6, 1986, when he collapsed during a run and was found pulseless on a curb. Doctors from NASA doubted the incidents were related to space travel, and noted that pre-flight testing indicated him having a tendency for cardiac arrhythmias during strenuous exercise.

On August 8, 1991, twenty years and a day after his return from the Moon, Irwin suffered another heart attack after a bicycle ride. Attempts at resuscitation were unsuccessful, and Irwin died later that day. He is buried at Arlington National Cemetery.

Of the 12 men who have walked on the Moon, Irwin was the first to die. The James Irwin Charter Schools were founded in Colorado in his honor.

A patch cut by Irwin from a backpack abandoned on the Moon during the Apollo 15 mission was auctioned at Christie's in 2001 for $310,500 in a consignment of material from Irwin's estate that garnered "a combined $500,000".

== Organizations ==
Irwin was a member of the Air Force Association and the Society of Experimental Test Pilots. He was also a Freemason, initiated in Tejon Lodge No. 104 in Colorado Springs.

Irwin was a member of Civitan International, a nonprofit organization promoting community service, scientific research, and service to people with intellectual and developmental disabilities.

== Awards and honors ==
- Command Pilot Astronaut Wings
- Air Force Distinguished Service Medal
- two Air Force Commendation Medals
- NASA Distinguished Service Medal
- United Nations Peace Medal, 1971
- City of New York Gold Medal, 1971
- City of Chicago Gold Medal, 1971
- Air Force Association's David C. Schilling Trophy, 1971
- Robert J. Collier Trophy, 1971
- Haley Astronautics Award (American Institute of Aeronautics and Astronautics), 1972
- Arnold Air Society's John F. Kennedy Trophy, 1972

Irwin's other awards include: Belgium's Order of Leopold in 1971; Kitty Hawk Memorial Award, 1971; New York Police Department St. George Association's Golden Rule Award in 1972; Christian Service Award; Milan Hulbert Trophy of SWAP International in 1973.

He was also awarded an Honorary Doctorate of Astronautical Engineering from the University of Michigan in 1971; an honorary Doctorate of Science from the William Jewell College in 1971; and an honorary D.Sc. from the Samford University in 1972.

He was inducted into the International Space Hall of Fame in 1983, and posthumously into the U.S. Astronaut Hall of Fame, on October 4, 1997.

In 1973, When Irwin visited the city of Minden, Louisiana, to address a gathering at the First Baptist Church, Mayor Tom Colten declared "James Irwin Day" and made Irwin an "honorary citizen of Minden."

== In media ==
The character of Spike Tiggler in the 1989 novel A History of the World in 10½ Chapters by Julian Barnes is based on Irwin.

In the 1998 HBO miniseries From the Earth to the Moon Irwin was played by Gareth Williams.

== Bibliography ==
- To Rule the Night: The Discovery Voyage of Astronaut Jim Irwin (with William A. Emerson, Jr., 1973)
- More Than Earthlings (1983)
- More Than an Ark on Ararat: Spiritual Lessons Learned While Searching for Noah's Ark (with Monte Unger, 1985)
- Destination: Moon (1989)
- Flight of the Falcon: The Thrilling Adventures of Colonel Jim Irwin (1991)

== See also ==
- List of spaceflight records
