= Index =

Index (pl.: indexes or indices) most commonly refers to:

- Index (publishing), an organized list of information in a publication
- Web indexing, Internet indexing
- An index, a key in an associative array

Index may also refer to:

== Arts, entertainment, and media ==
=== Fictional entities ===
- Index (A Certain Magical Index), a character in the light novel series A Certain Magical Index
- The Index, an item on the Halo Array in the Halo video game series

=== Periodicals and news portals ===
- Index Magazine, a publication for art and culture
- Index.hr, a Croatian online newspaper
- index.hu, a Hungarian-language news and community portal
- The Index (Kalamazoo College), a student newspaper
- The Index, an 1860s European propaganda journal created by Henry Hotze to support the Confederate States of America
- Truman State University Index, a student newspaper
- The Index: A Weekly Paper Devoted to Free Religion (1870–1886), the semi-official periodical of the Free Religious Association

=== Other arts, entertainment, media ===
- The Index (band)
- Indexed, a Web cartoon by Jessica Hagy
- Index, album by Ana Mena

== Business enterprises and events ==
- Index (retailer), a former UK catalogue retailer
- INDEX, a market research fair in Lucknow, India
- Index Corporation, a Japanese video game developer

== Finance ==
- Index fund, a collective investment scheme
- Stock market index, a statistical average of prices of selected securities

== Places in the United States ==
- Index, Arkansas, an unincorporated community
- Index, Kentucky, an unincorporated community
- Index, Missouri, a ghost town
- Index, New York, a hamlet in Hartwick and Otsego, New York
- Index, Virginia, an unincorporated community
- Index, Washington, a town
- Index, West Virginia, an unincorporated community

== Publishing and library studies ==
- Index (typography), a hand- or fist-shaped punctuation mark
- Bibliographic index, a regularly updated publication that lists articles, books, or other information items
- Citation index
- The Index, colloquial name for the List of Media Harmful to Youth and Adolescents (Germany)
- Index card, used for recording and storing small amounts of data
- Index Librorum Prohibitorum, a list of publications which the Catholic Church censored
- Index on Censorship, a publishing organization that campaigns for freedom of expression, or its magazine of the same name
- Subject indexing, describing the content of a document by keywords
- Thumb index, a round cut-out in the pages of a publication

== Science, technology, and mathematics ==
=== Computer science ===
- U+0084 <control-0084> Index, a character in Unicode
- Index, the dataset maintained by search engine indexing
- Array index, an integer pointer into an array data structure
- BitTorrent index, a list of .torrent files available for searches
- Database index, a data structure that improves the speed of data retrieval
- Index mapping of raw data for an array
- Index register, a processor register used for modifying operand addresses during the run of a program
- Indexed color, in computer imagery
- Indexed Sequential Access Method (ISAM), used for indexing data for fast retrieval
- Lookup table, a data structure used to store precomputed information
- Site map, or site index, a list of pages of a website accessible to crawlers or users
- Web server directory index, a default or index web page in a directory on a web server, such as index.html

=== Economics ===
- Index (economics), a single number calculated from an array of prices and quantities
  - Price index, a typical price for some good or service

=== Mathematics and statistics ===
==== General ====
- Index, the position of an element in a sequence
- Index, a number or other symbol that specifies an element of an indexed family or set
- Index, an element of an index set
- Index, the label of a summand in Σ-notation of a summation

==== Algebra ====
- Index of a subgroup, the number of a subgroup's left cosets
- Index, the degree of an nth root
- Index of a linear map, the dimension of the map's kernel minus the dimension of its cokernel
- Index of a matrix
- Index of a real quadratic form

==== Analysis ====
- Cauchy index, characterizing poles of a rational function
- Index, the winding number of an oriented closed curve on a surface relative to a point on that surface
- Diversity index, a measure of distribution or variety in fields such as ecology or information science
- Index of a vector field, an integer that helps to describe the behaviour of a vector field around an isolated zero

==== Number theory ====
- Index, or the discrete logarithm of a number

==== Statistics ====
- Index (statistics), a type of aggregate measure
  - Scale (social sciences), a method of reporting data in social sciences, sometimes called an index

=== Other uses in science and technology ===
- Indexicality, in linguistics, the phenomenon of a sign pointing to some object in the context in which it occurs
- Indexing (motion), in mechanical engineering and machining, movement to a precisely known location
- Index (physical sciences), a synonym for ratio
- INDEX, earlier name for the Reimei satellite

== Other uses ==
- Index:, a Danish nonprofit organization that promotes Design for Life
- The Index (Dubai), a skyscraper
- Index (crater), a Moon crater
- In semiotics, an unintentional and non-arbitrary sign causally related to what it indicates, for example the smoke from a fire or the footprint of an animal

== See also ==
- Indexi, a Yugoslav rock band
- Indexer (disambiguation)
- Directory (disambiguation)
