= Director (occupation) =

A number of occupations and positions with a supervisory capacity use the title director, including:

== Arts and design ==
- Animation director
- Artistic director
- Creative director
- Design director
- Film director
- Music director
- Music video director
- Television director
- Theatre director

== In other fields ==
- Director (business), a senior-level management position
- Director (colonial), head of chartered company's colonial administration for a territory
- Director (education), head of a university or other educational body
- Company director, a member of (for example) a board of directors
- Cruise director
- Executive director, senior operating officer or manager of an organization or corporation, usually at a nonprofit
- Finance director or chief financial officer
- Funeral director
- Managing director
- Non-executive director
- Technical director
- Tournament director

== See also ==
- Board of directors
- Deputy Director
- Director general
- Directeur sportif, a person directing a cycling team during a road bicycle racing event
