= Direct =

Direct may refer to:

== Mathematics ==
- Directed set, in order theory
- Direct limit of (pre), sheaves
- Direct sum of modules, a construction in abstract algebra which combines several vector spaces

== Computing ==
- Direct access (disambiguation), a method of accessing data in a database
- Direct connect (disambiguation), various methods of telecommunications and computer networking
- Direct memory access, access to memory by hardware subsystems independently of the CPU

== Entertainment ==
- Direct (Tower of Power album)
- Direct (Vangelis album)
- Direct (EP), by The 77s

== Other uses ==
- Direct (music symbol), a music symbol used in music notation that is similar to a catchword in literature
- Nintendo Direct, an online presentation frequently held by Nintendo
- Mars Direct, a proposal for a crewed mission to Mars
- DIRECT, a proposed space shuttle-derived launch vehicle
- DirectX, a proprietary dynamic media platform
- Direct current, a direct flow of electricity
- Direct examination, the in-trial questioning of a witness by the party who has called him or her to testify

== See also ==
- Direction (disambiguation)
- Director (disambiguation)
- Indirect (disambiguation)
