= Director =

Director (occupation) refers to several human occupations or positions.

Director may also refer to:

== Arts and media ==
=== Fictional entities ===
- The Director, an artificial intelligence system in the video game Left 4 Dead

=== Literature ===
- Director (magazine), a British business and lifestyle magazine
- The Director (Denker novel), a 1971 novel by Henry Denker
- The Director (Kehlmann novel), a 2023 novel by Daniel Kehlmann
- The Director (play), a 2000 play by Nancy Hasty

=== Movies ===
- Director (1969 film), a Soviet film directed by Alexey Saltykov
- Director (2009 film), an American film directed by Aleks Rosenberg

=== Music ===
- Director (band), an Irish rock band
- Director (Avant album) (2006)
- Director (Yonatan Gat album)

== People ==
- Aaron Director (1901–2004), professor at the University of Chicago Law School
- Kim Director (born 1974), American actress

== Science, technology, and transportation ==
- Director, the spatial and temporal average of the orientation of the long molecular axis within a small volume element of liquid crystal
- Director (military), a device that continuously calculates firing data
- Adobe Director (formerly MacroMind VideoWorks), a multimedia application authoring platform
- Fibre Channel director, a large switch for computer storage networks
- Director telephone system, used by exchanges in some British cities in the 1920s–1980s
- GCR Class 11E (nicknamed "Directors"), a class of locomotives named after directors of the Great Central Railway
- HMS Director (1784), a ship of the British Royal Navy

== Other uses ==
- Directors beer, by Courage Brewery

== See also ==
- Director (occupation)
- Deputy Director (disambiguation)
- Directeur sportif, a person directing a cycling team during a road bicycle racing event
- Director-general
- Director string, a way of tracking free variables in computation
- Board of directors
- Directorial system
- Directorate (disambiguation)
- Directory (disambiguation)
- Direct (disambiguation)
