= Edge index =

Index formed by marks on the edges of printed pages

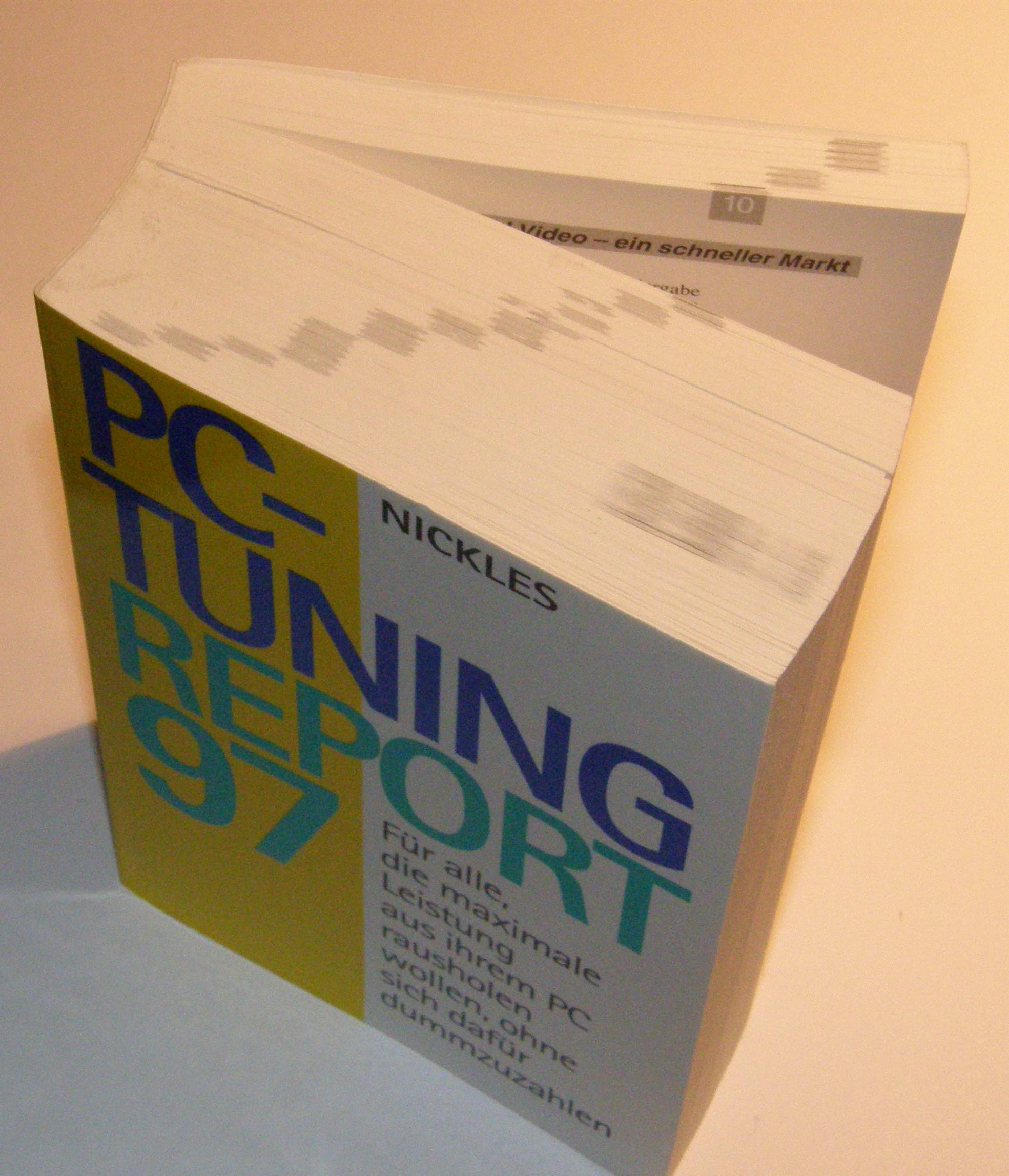
Edge index at the top cut

An edge index is a form of index that consists of marks on the edges of the pages of a printed work. These marks are step-like printed and usually contain order words, letters, or numbers, (e.g., A to Z in a dictionary or telephone book). Usually, they are colored and help to find desired points, especially in reference works. They are created by printing to the edge of the sheet so that they are visible on the closed books' edge.

Advantageously, edge indexing is part of the printing process, permits nearly unlimited headings, and does not add to the cost of binding. These are offset by the disadvantage of being unable to know what a mark refers to without opening the book.

== Description ==
Edge indices are forms of index that consists of marks on the edges of the pages of a printed work. These marks are step-like printed and usually contain order words, letters, or numbers, (e.g., A to Z in a dictionary or telephone book). Usually, they are colored and help to find desired points, especially in reference works. They are created by printing to the edge of the sheet so that they are visible on the closed books' edge. When each edge index mark labels one chapter, the desired one can be found by counting the marks. When the edge index marks label first letters in a dictionary or telephone book, some can be identified by their "thickness", (e.g., in English there are only few words beginning with "Q", but many beginning with "S").

== Advantages and disadvantages ==
Edge indexing has several advantages: It is part of the printing process, allows near unlimited headings, and does not add to the binding costs. Its main disadvantage is generally being unable to know what a mark refers to without opening the book, though a coloring scheme may be employed to minimize this downside.

== Terminology ==
An edge index is distinct from a thumb index, but the terms thumb index or chapter thumbs have been applied to edge indices.

== Gallery ==
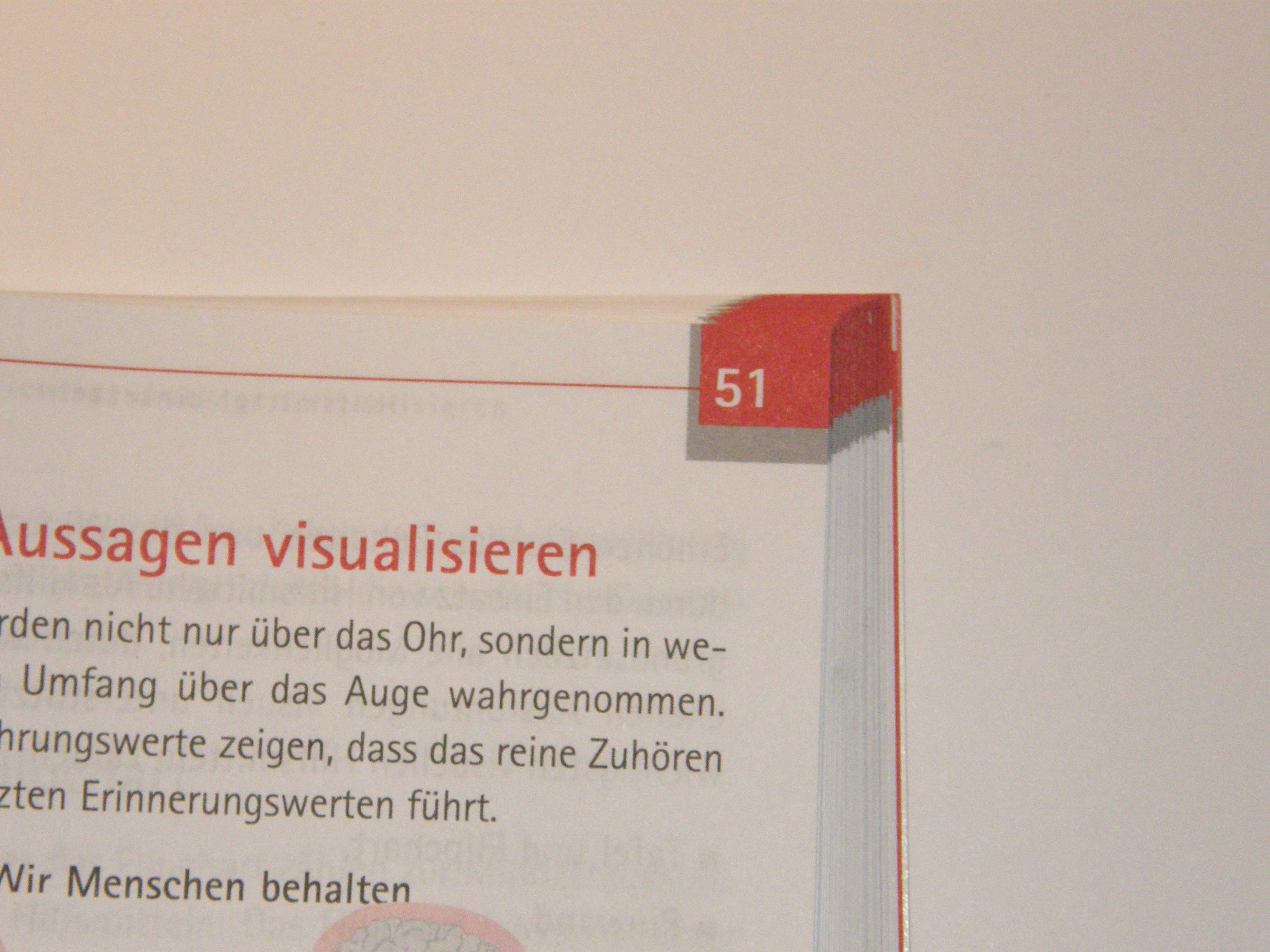
Page number at the top cut edge

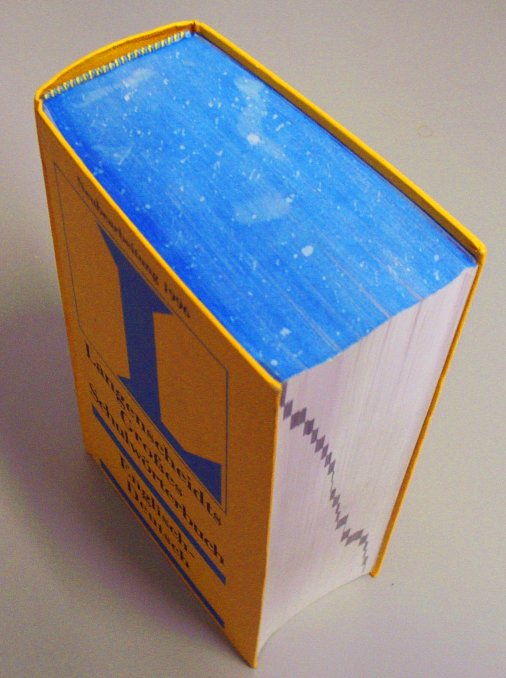
Book with blue cut decoration and edge index

== See also ==
- Index (publishing)
