= L. Isabel Heald =

American social leader and philanthropic worker

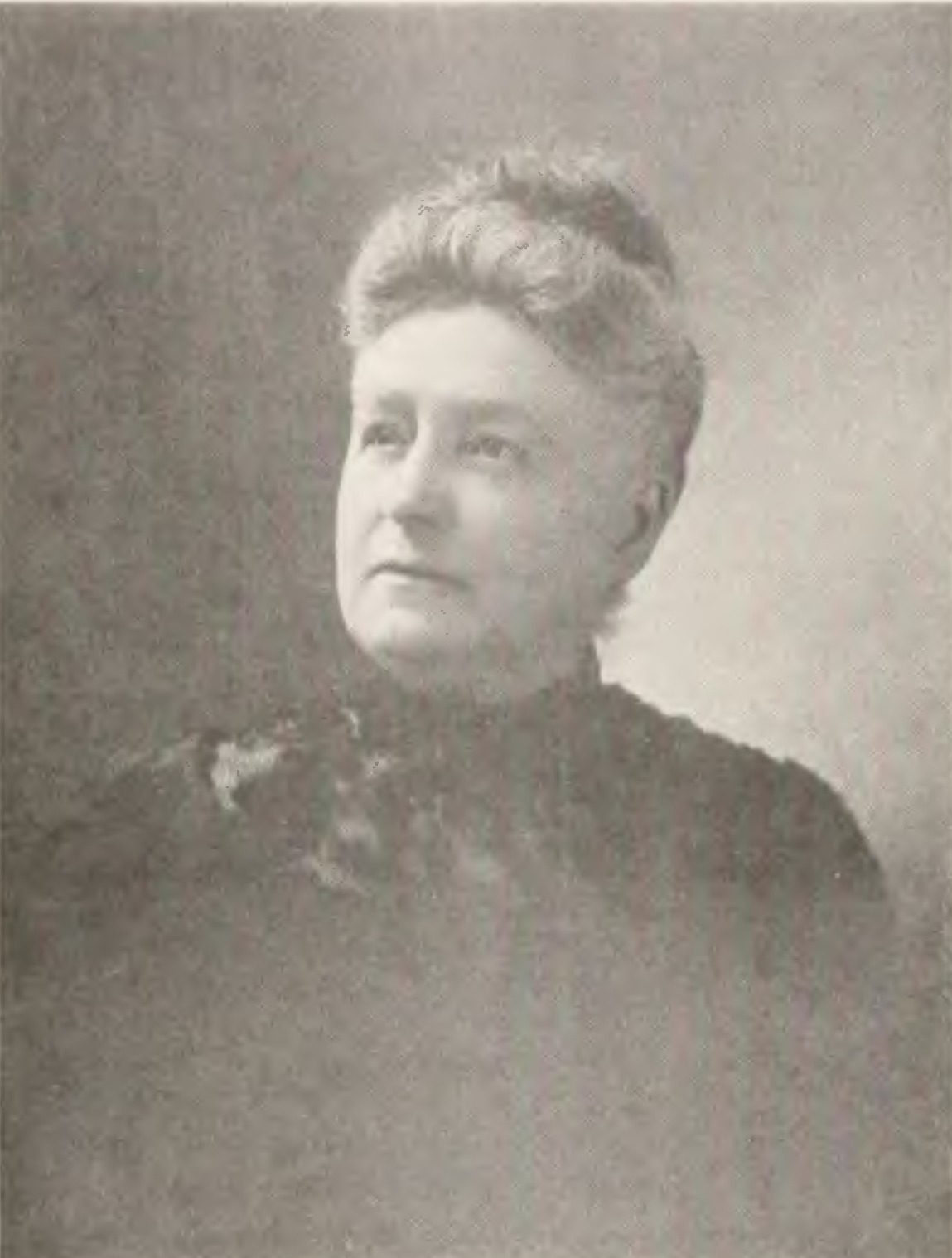
- Born: Lydia Isabel Cutler; October 24, 1842; Dexter, Maine, U.S.
- Died: January 24, 1932; Portland, Maine
- Occupations: social leader; philanthropic worker

L. Isabel Heald (née, Cutler; 1842–1932) was an American social leader and philanthropic worker. Active in charitable and club work in the State of Maine, she belonged at one time to 14 organizations. Heald served as president of the Maine division of the International Sunshine Society (ISS).

== Early life and education ==
Lydia Isabel Cutler was born in Dexter, Maine, October 24, 1842. She was the daughter of Otis and Emeline Robinson Seavy Cutler. Her father, moving to Portland, Maine in 1852, became the first appraiser at the port, and was holding this office at the time of his death, in May 1868. His wife survived him many years, dying in May 1884. Heald's siblings including Mary, Charles, Sarah, and Fred.

Otis Cutler was of the seventh generation of that branch of the Cutler family in New England, whose immigrant progenitor, John by name, died at Hingham, Massachusetts, in February 1638. It was said that John Cutler, of Hingham, came from the vicinity of Norwich, England, in 1637. From another English-born Cutler, Robert, of Charlestown, Boston, Massachusetts, was descended the Rev. Timothy Cutler, D.D., the first rector of Christ Church, Boston (now, Old North Church), and "one of the first scholars of his age in the colonies".

The family home being in Portland during Heald's childhood and youth, she was educated in the city schools, and attended the Girls' High School. Her education continued later through general reading, specializing in metaphysics. Deeply religious, Heald became a member of the Episcopal church when she was very young. A student of creeds, she studied ancient and modern philosophy, science, theosophy, and the works of deep thinkers of all ages, not for diversion, but to find truth. Her creed was, "Love thy neighbor".

== Career ==
For a number of years, she was active in charitable and club work. It was she who was instrumental in forming the Cumberland Relief Cure, an organization which raised funds to send 25 men to the Keely Cure, furnishing and equipping a reading room for them.

Beginning in 1901, she served as State president of the Maine division of the ISS (known as the Reliance Branch), and incorporated it. In this position, she wrote no less than 60 letters a week. There were approximately 150 daily and weekly papers reporting "Sunshine" news and Heald was appointed the leader in Maine of the York. In a letter to the Journal the president-general, Cynthia Westover Alden, wrote:—

"With your energetic president, Mrs. Heald, of Portland, the State is becoming thoroughly organized. In fact, it is the best organized in Sunshine work of any State in the Union. There are now two thousand and sixty-six well-organized Sunshine branches reporting regularly..."

Heald was for five years the president of the Beecher Club, whose study was evolution. She was on the executive board of many of the well-known Portland, Maine associations, including the Women's Literary Union. She was a member of the advisory board, Free Hospital for Crippled Children. She was also a member of the Elizabeth Wadsworth Chapter, Daughters of the American Revolution, Equal Suffrage Club, Women's Council, and the Prison Committee Portland Fresh Air Society.

== Personal life ==
At Portland, Maine on August 31, 1870, she married John Sumner Heald, claims adjuster of the Maine Central Railroad. He was the grandson of the Hon. Mark Langdon Hill, of Phippsburg, Maine, one of the early settlers, a prominent and wealthy man in his day. Lydia and John had one daughter, who died in infancy.

Lydia Isabel Heald died in Portland, Maine, January 24, 1932.
