= Redirect =

Redirect and its variants (e.g., redirection) may refer to:

== Arts, entertainment, and media ==
- Redirect (album), 2012 Christian metal album and its title track by Your Memorial
- Redirected (film), a 2014 action comedy film

== Computing ==
- ICMP Redirect Message, a mechanism for routers to convey routing information to hosts
- URL redirection, a mechanism for making a web page available under more than one address
- Redirection (computing), the redirection of streams of data into one another

== Law ==
- Redirect examination, a trial process in law

== See also ==
- Direct (disambiguation)
- Redirector (disambiguation)
