= Itemization =

Itemization may refer to:

- List
- Itemized deduction, in United States tax law, expenses that individual taxpayers can claim on federal income tax returns
