= Mary C. Seward =

American poet

Mary Coggeshall Seward
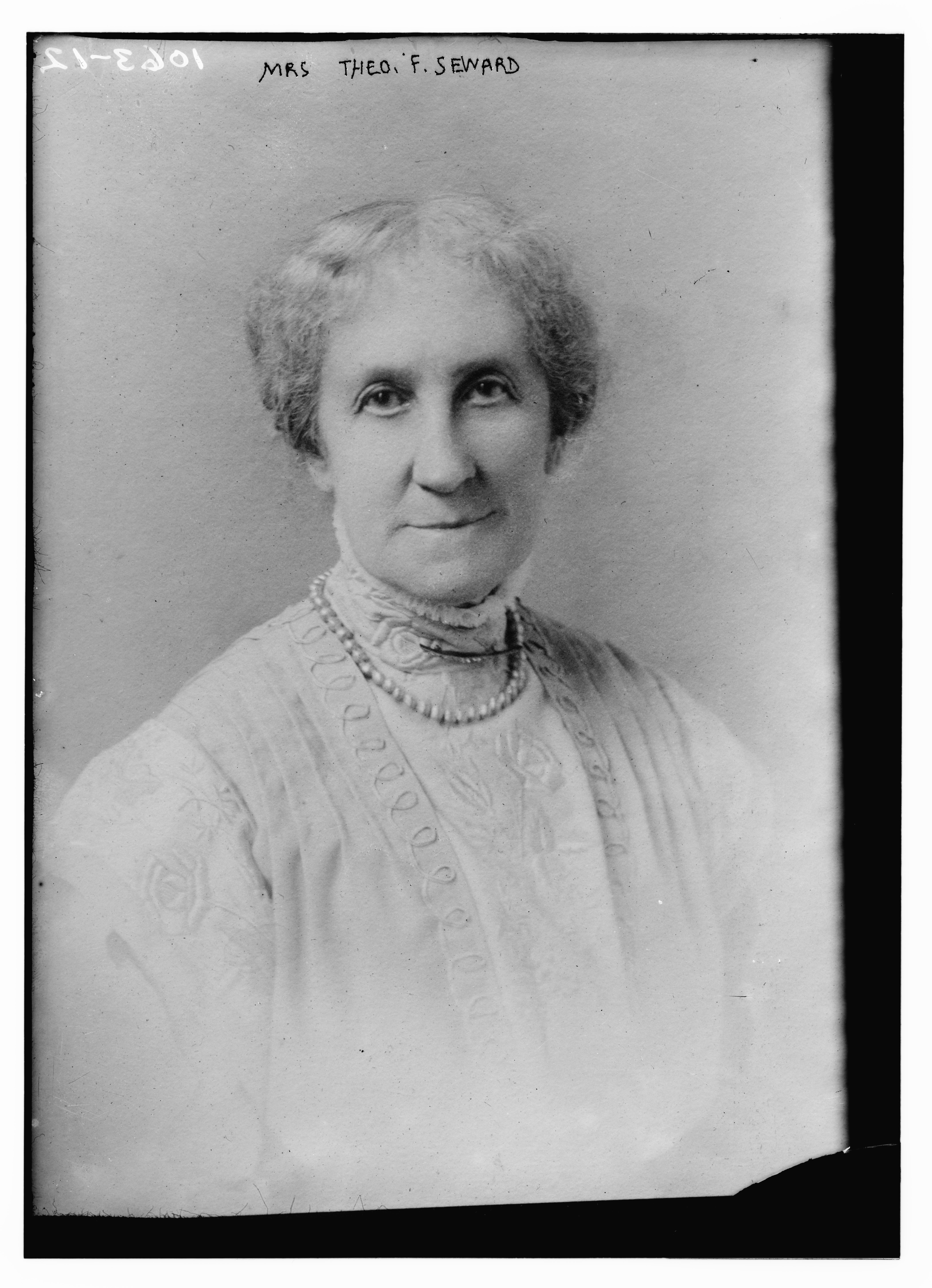
- Born: Mary Holden Coggeshall; July 9, 1839; New London, Connecticut
- Died: circa September 1, 1919 (aged 80); Buffalo bound train, New York
- Other name: Agnes Burney
- Education: New London Female Academy
- Occupations: Parliamentarian; Poet; Composer; Philanthropist
- Organization: International Sunshine Society
- Known for: Leadership of charities and woman's clubs, major reforms in care for blind babies, carol The Christmas Bells
- Spouse: Theodore F. Seward (m. 1860)
- Children: 3
- Parent(s): William Holden Coggeshall; Sarah Latham (Ashbey) Coggeshall

Mary Holden Coggeshall Seward (July 9, 1839 – circa September 1, 1919), commonly known as Mary C. Seward, was an American poet, composer, and prominent parliamentarian serving humanitarian and woman's club movements of the late nineteenth and early twentieth centuries. A number of her works were published under the pseudonym "Agnes Burney" , including several developed in collaboration with her spouse, Theodore F. Seward, an internationally known composer and music educator in his day. She became a groundbreaking advocate for the care and education of blind babies and young children during her later years, serving as president of the department for the blind of the International Sunshine Society (I.S.S.).

== Early years ==
Seward was born Mary Holden Coggeshall in New London, Connecticut. Her father, William Holden Coggeshall, was a veteran of the War of 1812 and a descendant of John Coggeshall, first president of the colony of Rhode Island. She was educated at the New London Female Academy where she studied under Hiram Warner Farnsworth. In 1860 she married Theodore F. Seward, a composer and music teacher who had previously worked as organist of a New London church. They lived in Rochester and Brooklyn in New York before relocating to East Orange, New Jersey in 1868.

== Poet and composer ==
Words and music dedicated to singer Emma C. Thursby (1879)

Though not prolific, her poems and tunes appeared in numerous periodicals and music books. They were published under her name, her pseudonym Agnes Burney, or anonymously on occasion. Her carol The Christmas Bells (circa 1869) has been set to music by at least five different composers. She produced tunes for her own lyrics as well as those of other poets; one of the most widely published was her setting of Mary A. Lathbury's Easter Carol (circa 1883).

She had a long creative relationship with her composer husband and wrote verses for many of his songs. The 1867 collection The Temple Choir, one of Theodore F. Seward's most successful hymnbooks, contained both words and music credited to her pseudonym. She frequently accompanied him on business trips, including the second European tour of the Fisk Jubilee Singers in 1875 for which he was voice trainer and musical director.

== Club woman and parliamentarian ==
Exterior and library of the Woman's Club of Orange, NJ (circa 1908)

Seward was involved with the woman's club movement for forty-seven years. She was a member of Sorosis, the first American club dedicated to the improvement and advancement of professional women, and an organizer of the National Society of New England Women which she served twice as president. She belonged to the Woman's Club of Orange since its inception where, as president, she made the motion calling for the formation of the New Jersey State Federation of Women's Clubs. She was a charter member of the International Sunshine Society founded by Cynthia W. Alden and served it many years as first vice president.

She identified herself as a “parliamentarian”, one proficient with “the minute details of presiding, of debating, of making motions, of conducting meetings.” Fellow “club women” described her as follows:

She is an able parliamentarian and presides at meetings with ease and grace. She has the qualities of a good speaker, expressing herself clearly and fluently. ... [S]he has always been identified with those who did something that stood for an ideal or a purpose.

— E. Marguerite Lindley and Juanita Leland, The National Society of NE Women

== Philanthropy and later years ==
First blind babies and children education legislation of New York State (1912)

ISS Department for the Blind advertisement (January, 1917)

The I.S.S., of which Seward was an officer, supported "Sunshine Homes" for the care and education of young children with a variety of disabilities. A Branch for the Blind was created in 1904 to provide services for blind children below the age of eight that existing public programs either ignored or had been housing with the mentally challenged. The society opposed the then broadly held misconception that blind babies were "feeble-minded". A preliminary Sunshine Home for blind babies was established in a three-room New York City flat and other donated space. Founder Cynthia W. Alden described the approach:

Our Society takes the blind babies and keeps them normal by seeing that as they grow they do what a seeing baby or child of that age should do. This means constant training all their waking hours.

In 1905, the I.S.S. Department (originally Branch) for the Blind was separately incorporated with Seward serving as president. It acquired property in Dyker Heights, Brooklyn, New York for a larger facility to function as a combined home, nursery, hospital, and kindergarten. They petitioned the New York City Board of Education for support and in 1907 the Dyker Heights Home for Blind Babies became the site of the first public kindergarten for blind children in the United States operated by a major board of education. Seward subsequently became president of the Arthur Home for Blind Babies in Summit, New Jersey when it was established as a second combined facility in 1909.

The Department for the Blind also pursued critical legislative support. New York City passed the first legislation addressing the education and training of blind babies and young children in 1908. Thirteen states implemented relevant laws during the decade that followed, including New Jersey in 1911 and New York in 1912. Seward reported that "legislation in behalf of the blind baby was conceded by all members to be the greatest work of the society."

Seward continued to work as an advocate for blind babies and director of Arthur Home for the remainder of her life. As an officer of the I.S.S., she performed these tasks without pay or other compensation. She died suddenly on board a train bound for Buffalo, New York a few days before September 3, 1919.
