= Index Township, Cass County, Missouri =

Township in Cass County, Missouri, U.S.

Coordinates: 38.6228°N 94.1631°W

Index Township is an inactive township in Cass County, in the U.S. state of Missouri.

Index Township was established in 1872, taking its name from Index, Missouri.
