= KTRM =

Student-run FM radio station in Missouri

KTRM-FM
- Kirksville, Missouri; United States
- Frequency: 88.7 MHz (HD Radio)

Programming
- Format: College radio; Alternative rock

Ownership
- Owner: Board of Governors; Truman State University

History
- First air date: February 10, 1998
- Call sign meaning: Truman

Technical information
- Licensing authority: FCC
- Facility ID: 82440
- Class: A
- ERP: 3,500 watts
- HAAT: 60 meters (200 ft)
- Transmitter coordinates: 40.1778°N 92.5780°W

Links
- Public license information: Public file; LMS
- Website: ktrm.truman.edu

KTRM (88.7 FM) is an FM non-commercial/educational radio station operated by students at Truman State University in Kirksville, Missouri. The station features alternative music, with specialty shows hosted in the evenings and on weekends. KTRM broadcasts at 3,500 watts effective radiated power, covering Adair County and rural areas within a 25-mile radius.

KTRM also streams online using QuickTime.

== History ==
KTRM was originally envisioned in 1975, when the Department of Language and Literature sought to establish a 100,000 watt FM station. The university, however, decided to pursue an unlicensed operation, regulated by Part 15 of FCC code. Under the letters KNEU (for Northeast Missouri State University, Truman's previous name), the station debuted in October 1975 at 1600 AM. Because the power levels allowed by Part 15 only resulted in a small coverage area, transmitters were purchased for each residence hall.

The reception of the 1600 AM signal was not ideal in several of the brick and mortar halls. In February 1976, KNEU moved to 580 AM and rewired the transmitters in each building. In the late 1970s, KNEU added FM coverage, but students could only receive the 102.1 FM signal on-campus via Cable FM. KNEU also broadcast on the university's public service channels.

Ten years after an earlier attempt failed, the Department of Language and Literature filed an application with the FCC for licensing. The Board of Governors approved the application's submission, and in 1996, Truman received a construction permit from the FCC. The original license assigned call letters KAVT on June 16, 1997. Because the KNEU call sign was used by a religious station in Utah, the university requested and received the call letters KTRM on August 15, 1997, representative of the university's new name.

At 2 p.m. on February 10, 1998, University President Jack Magruder flipped the switch, powering the antenna and bringing "Kirksville's Tru Alternative" online. KTRM broadcast from studios on the first floor of the Student Union Building prior to the building undergoing renovation after April 2007. KTRM and the rest of the campus media relocated to Barnett Hall, on the southern edge of campus, in fall 2007. While their counterparts Index and News36 restarted operations at the start of the following semester, KTRM remained off the air until December because of delays in installing equipment that will make the station capable of broadcasting with a digital signal. In December 2008, KTRM returned to the air with a higher power of 2,500 watts broadcasting in HD.

KTRM went to 24-hour operation in October 2006. The station is advised by a faculty member in the Department of Communication at Truman State University.

KTRM has won numerous awards for its broadcast service, including national honors from the Intercollegiate Broadcasting System. In 2013, Geoffrey Woehlk was named Station Manager of the Year and Brooke Giddens received a national IBS award for Program Director of the Year. KTRM has also received numerous regional awards from the Missouri Broadcast Educators Association (MBEA). In addition to the radio shows, the station also hosts concerts and artists on campus, recently including Sir Babygirl and Nyssa. It was recently featured in RadioWorld magazine.

== KTRM (AM) Beaumont ==
The KTRM call sign was previously used by an AM station in Beaumont, Texas. J.P. Richardson (AKA The Big Bopper) made his debut at that station in 1949 as an announcer before becoming a Top-40 performer. George Jones worked there when he was first starting out. That station, broadcasting at 990 kHz, is now the Gospel Music station KZZB.

== See also ==
- Campus radio
- List of college radio stations in the United States
