= Clara Estelle Baumhoff =

American writer and philanthropist

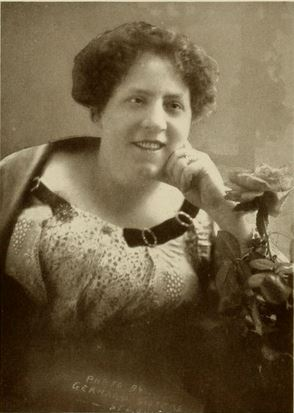
- Born: Clara Estella Zeiss Baumhoff; March 20, 1867; St. Louis, Missouri, U.S.
- Died: March 27, 1919 (aged 52)

Clara Estella Zeiss Baumhoff (March 20, 1867 – March 27, 1919) was the founder of the Missouri Division of the International Sunshine Society (ISS); in fourteen years of leadership brought more than twenty-five thousand members into the ISS through her press departments on Sunshine, and by her personal efforts.

== Biography ==
Clara Estella Zeiss was born on March 20, 1867, in St. Louis, Missouri, the daughter of Carl Zeiss and Helen E. Dreyer (1840–1907).

Mrs. C. W. Trowbridge was the first State president of the ISS, and Baumhoff acted as treasurer and secretary, also superintendent of junior work. This State Branch was organized in 1902. The USS was founded in 1896, in New York, with eighteen members, by Cynthia Westover Alden. In 1914 the membership numbered over 300,000, and extended to all parts of the world. Of the original members who supported and assisted the Sunshine Sewing School, only the following were living in 1914: Mrs. Wm. E. Warren (who was Mrs. F. M. Biebinger), Mrs. John Conrath, Mrs. W. H. Sturgess, Lola V. Hays, Marcella Keys-Hanaford, Mrs. Jos. Maloney, and Mrs. J. C. Woodson. Baumhoff became the honorary president, while Marcella Keys-Hanaford was the president.

The ISS accomplished a wonderful amount of good in places where the regularly organized charitable associations could not readily reach. They were always quick to respond to appeals for assistance, taking methods for placing the sick and afflicted in immediate touch with the best care and attention from physicians, placing them in hospitals, and rendering any assistance that may be needed in any direction, ranging from temporary relief from poverty to long treatments for chronic cases of disease of body and mind.

While the work was general, yet in 1914, Baumhoff's special plan was to reach, through her Missouri Division, all the people possible by the press, pulpit, free lectures — which she gave by traveling all through the State — correspondence and sending out of literature on the subject, on the prevention of blindness, and to give those already blind opportunities of education to enable them to become self-respecting and independent. She wanted to awaken an interest throughout the State in the care, maintenance and training of dependent blind children, before presenting the Blind Babies' Bill to the next Legislature. In her lectures, she proposed to use the deaf, dumb and blind deserted child — who already had all these advantages to demonstrate the possibilities of and necessity for such care.

Baumhoff resigned as State president of the Missouri Branch, that she could devote all her time to the interest of the blind children of Missouri, and in honor of her long and faithful service to the State organization was unanimously elected honorary president of the Missouri Division for life. Besides the care of blind children, the society maintained a baby ward in the Children's Home Society of Missouri. Much convalescent work was also done, wheelchairs were provided where needed, and social service work of the city was always greatly assisted by the Sunshine Society of St. Louis.

Baumhoff also gave, during 1914, a series of lectures to young women to help them look out for themselves, and eliminate, as far as possible, the foundation of trouble, illness, or wrong, caused by the words, "I did not know."

The following Sunshine Memorials, most of which were studied, financed, and put into good order by Baumhoff, before presenting to the State Sunshine for adoption, were: Winter of 1901–1902, maintained the Sunshine Sewing School at Seventh and Gratiot Streets, thereby aiding 200 poor children and their parents; closely followed by furnishing a room in the Sunshine Convalescent Home in the Mountains of Hendersonville, N. C; room in the New Blind Girls' Home (St. Louis); two cribs in the Brooklyn Blind Babies' Home; Sunshine Baby Ward in the Missouri Cliildren's Home (St. Louis), with eighteen memorial cribs; aided three Sunshine Scholarships; maintained a crib in the St. Louis Children's Hospital for five years; gave twenty-one libraries to isolated towns and institutions; loan of ten wheelchairs to shut-ins unable to buy or rent one; assisted, placed and supported eighteen refined old folks, many of them four-score years; cheering the shut-ins and four-score members; helped and saved young girls from temptation and vice.

Before adopting Baumhoff's seven-year studied plan of intelligent mothering, care and training of blind children under school age in their own homes, as far as it is deemed advisable, it was considered wisest to protect all of the Sunshine interests by incorporating the Missouri Division, ISS, which was accomplished January 25, 1912. It was hoped by using this plan for blind children to preserve the little children's individuality by mothering, and at less expense, and to make no efforts to establish a blind babies' home until absolutely necessary.

The local work owed much of its success to the press and the cooperation with other social agencies, which avoided duplication of work, waste of time and expense.

Baumhoff was a charter member of two writers' clubs: the Papyrus Club and Twinkler's Club. She was a member of the Mother's Circle of the Shenandoah School, as well as of various educational and philanthropic organizations. She contributed many short stories for children and social service articles to leading magazines. She published a novel, That Awful Brother, embodying much of her ISS activities.

She married Frederick W. Baumhoff, postmaster of St. Louis, and had three sons, Eugene, Frederick William Baumhoff, Jr (1893–1958) and Herbert, all serving during World War I. During World War I, she was interested in war relief work and was one of the first women in St. Louis to assume an active part to aid the American soldiers in France. She lived at 3501 Victor Street, St. Louis, and died on March 27, 1919. She is buried at Bellefontaine Cemetery, St. Louis.
