= Dimies T. Stocking Denison =

American businesswoman (1852–1940)

Dimies Tryphena Stocking Denison
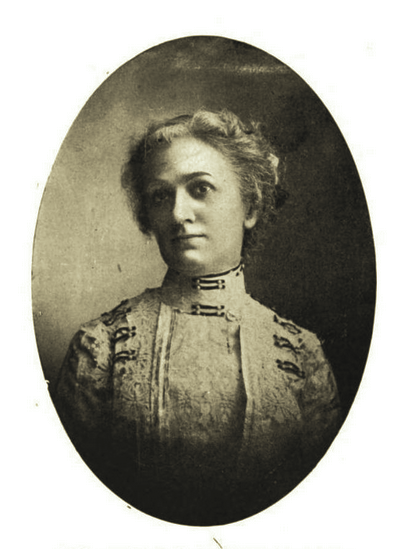
- Denison in the Official Register and Directory of Women's Clubs in America, 1913
- Born: May 7, 1852; New York, United States
- Died: September 2, 1940 (aged 88); Manhattan, New York, New York, United States
- Occupation(s): businesswoman, philanthropist and clubwoman
- Organization(s): International Sunshine Society, General Federation of Women's Clubs

Dimies Tryphena Stocking Denison, or Demeis (née Stocking, May 7, 1852 – September 2, 1940) was an American businesswoman, philanthropist and clubwoman. She was elected the president of the General Federation of Women's Clubs in 1902.

== Career ==
Denison's husband Charles Halbert Denison invented and patented the marginal index system for bookkeeping, known as thumb indexing, which scooped out places in books to enable the reader to turn to any section they want. When her husband died from heart failure in 1911, she took over the business, overseeing 15 staff and turning over $50,000 by 1936.

== Clubwoman ==
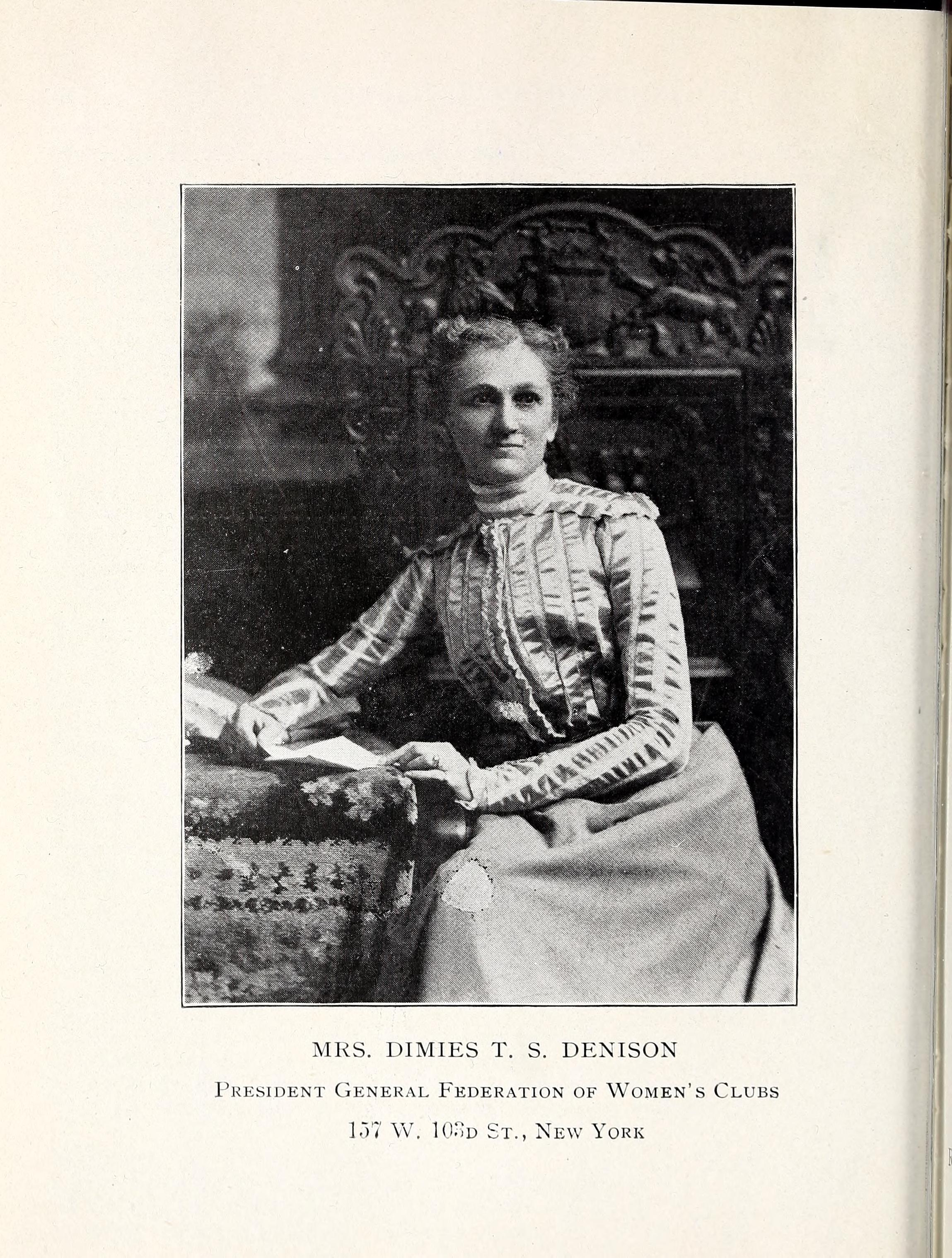
Denison in 1902

Denison was also a clubwoman and was vice president of the philanthropic newspaper club the International Sunshine Society, serving under the president Cynthia May Alden. Denison served as vice president of the General Federation of Women's Clubs (GFWC) for four years, then was elected president of the GFWC for a term of two years from 1902 to 1904. While a member of the GFWC, Denison endorsed Clara Burdette's movement to exclude African American women's organisations from joining the federation.

== Death ==
Denison died on September 2, 1940 in Manhattan, New York, New York, United States.
