= Track listing =

Sequential set of discrete parts on a recorded medium

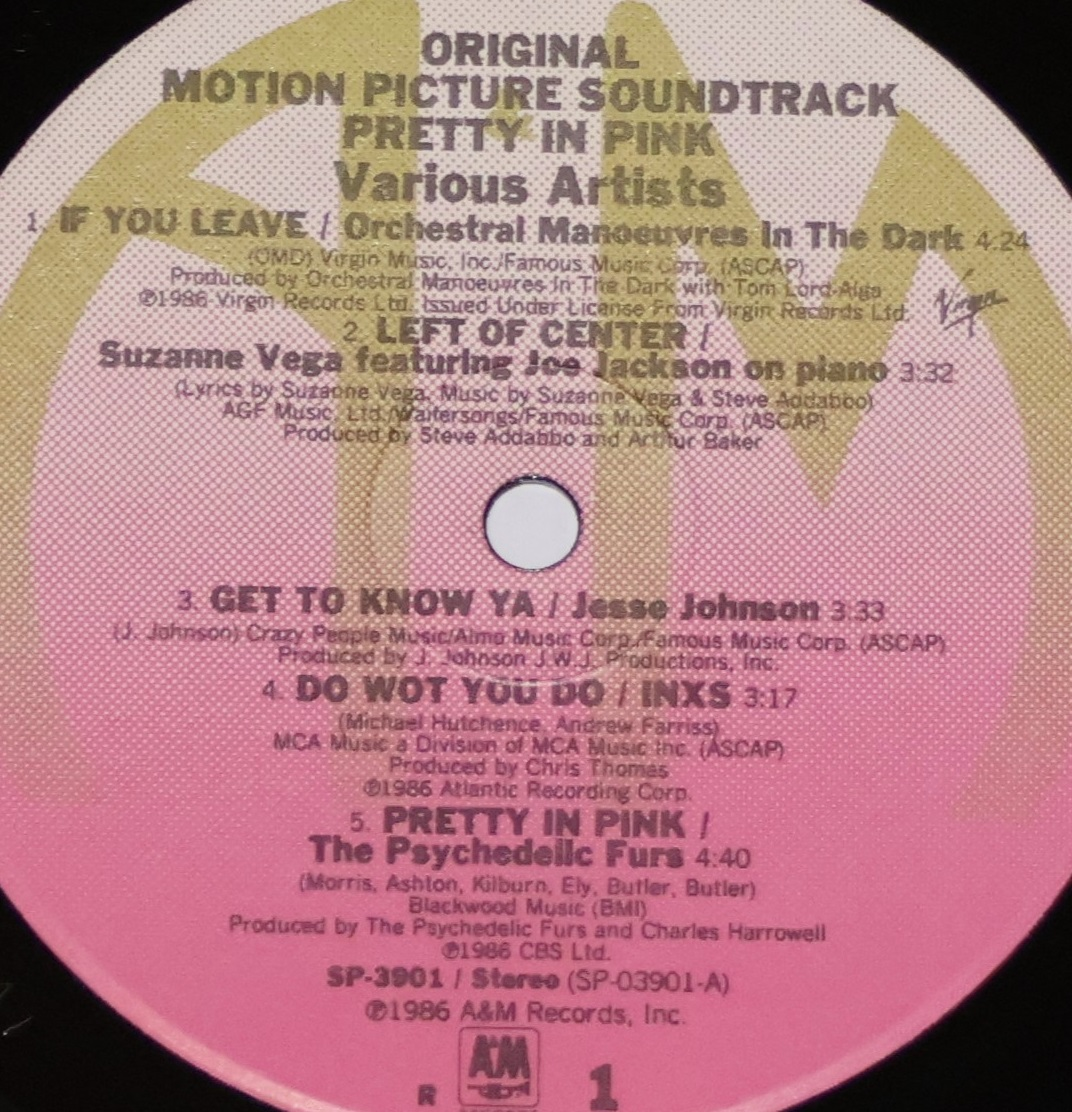
Track list printed on the Pretty in Pink soundtrack album, listing five songs by various artists.

In the field of sound recording and reproduction, a track listing (also called a track list or tracklist) is a list created in connection with a recorded medium to indicate the contents of that medium and their order. The most typical usage of a track listing is for songs or other discrete segments on an album.

Material (music or sounds) is stored on an album in sections termed tracks, normally 10 to 12 tracks on a typical full-length album, with a slight pause engineered to occur between them. A music track (often simply referred to as a track) is an individual song or instrumental recording. The term is particularly associated with popular music where separate tracks are known as album tracks; the term is also used for other formats such as EPs and singles. When vinyl records were the primary medium for audio recordings a track could be identified visually from the grooves and many album covers or sleeves included numbers for the tracks on each side. On a compact disc the track number is indexed so that a player can jump straight to the start of any track. On digital music stores such as iTunes the term song is often used interchangeably with track regardless of whether there is any vocal content.

A track that has the same name as the album is called a title track, although an album may instead have a title that is different from the titles of any songs on the album.

== History ==
The earliest medium for recorded music was phonograph records for home use, made of an abrasive (and therefore noisy) shellac compound, employing a large groove, and playing at approximately 78 revolutions per minute (rpm), limiting the playing time of a 12-inch diameter record to less than five minutes per side. Starting in 1926, the Edison Records company experimented with issuing Edison Disc Records in long play (or LP record) format of 24 minutes per side. The system and playback system (still mostly wind-up phonographs) proved unreliable and was a commercial failure. In September 1931, RCA Victor launched the first commercially available vinyl long-playing record, marketed as "Program-Transcription" records. These revolutionary discs were designed for playback at 33 1/3 rpm and pressed on a 30 cm diameter flexible plastic disc, with a duration of about ten minutes playing time per side. Victor's early introduction of a long-playing record was a commercial failure for several reasons including the lack of affordable, consumer playback equipment and consumer rejection during the Great Depression.

The 10-inch discs, mostly used for popular and light classical music, were normally pressed in shellac, but 12-inch discs, mostly used for "serious" classical music, were pressed in Victor's new vinyl-based "Victrolac" compound, which provided a much quieter playing surface. These records could hold up to 15 minutes per side. Beethoven's Fifth Symphony, performed by the Philadelphia Orchestra under Leopold Stokowski, was the first 12-inch recording issued. Since classical music tended to be written in longer pieces, albums of this length did not consist of multiple tracks, but of a single piece of music on each side, or split between the sides.

As technology advanced to allow for more than 20 minutes of recording on each side of a record, the Long Play format began to enjoy commercial popularity in the early 1950s. The popularity of the LP ushered in the "Album Era" of English-language popular music, beginning in the late 1950s, as performers took advantage of the longer playing time to create coherent themes or concept albums. Robert Christgau wrote in Christgau's Record Guide: Rock Albums of the Seventies (1981) that the popularity of this format "complicated how we perceive and remember what was once the most evanescent of the arts", observing that "the long-playing record, with its twenty-minute sides and four-to-six compositions/performances per side, suits my habits of concentration perfectly." The development of this format required musicians and record producers to consider the ideal arrangement of the collection of songs to be included in an album, including concepts such as story-telling, presenting a mix of different kinds of songs to avoid repetition, and presenting the best tracks at points in the record that will be most likely to catch the attention of the audience.

== Bonus tracks ==
A bonus track (also known as a bonus cut or just a bonus) is a piece of music which has been included as an extra. This may be done as a marketing promotion, or for other reasons. It is not uncommon to include singles, B-sides, live recordings, and demo recordings as bonus tracks on re-issues of old albums, where those tracks weren't originally included. Online music stores allow buyers to create their own albums by selecting songs themselves; bonus tracks may be included if a customer buys a whole album rather than just one or two songs from the artist. The song is not necessarily free nor is it available as a stand-alone download, adding also to the incentive to buy the complete album. In contrast to hidden tracks, bonus tracks are included on track listings and usually do not have a gap of silence between other album tracks. Bonus tracks on CD or vinyl albums are common in Japan for releases by European and North American artists; since importing international copies of the album can be cheaper than buying a domestically released version, Japanese releases often feature bonus tracks to incentivize domestic purchase.

== Hidden tracks ==
A hidden track (sometimes called a ghost track, secret track or unlisted track) is a song or a piece of audio that has been placed on a CD, audio cassette, LP record, or other recorded medium, in such a way as to avoid detection by the casual listener. In some cases, the piece of music may simply have been left off the track listing, while in other cases, more elaborate methods are used. In rare cases, a 'hidden track' is actually the result of an error that occurred during the mastering stage production of the recorded media. However, since the rise of digital and streaming services such as iTunes and Spotify in the late 2000s and early 2010s, the inclusion of hidden tracks has declined on studio albums.

It is occasionally unclear whether a piece of music is 'hidden.' For example, "Her Majesty," which is preceded by fourteen seconds of silence, was originally unlisted on The Beatles' Abbey Road but is listed on current versions of the album. That song and others push the definition of the term, causing a lack of consensus on what is considered a hidden track. Alternatively, such things are instead labeled as vague audio experiments, errors, or simply an integral part of an adjacent song on the record.

== See also ==
- Set list
