= Direct access =

Direct access may refer to:

- DirectAccess, a network technology in Windows 7 and Windows Server 2008 R2, and Windows 8 and Windows Server 2012
- Direct access (computing), a concept in computer science
- Direct Access Archive, a proprietary file format
- Direct access storage device, a secondary computer storage device
- Direct Access Test Unit, special numbers used to test telephone exchanges
- Direct access trading, a technology for stock trading
