= Clara Nettie Bates =

American editor, writer, clubwoman

Clara Nettie Bates (December 25, 1876 – November 27, 1966) was an American editor, writer, and clubwoman. She was associated with the Audubon movement in Michigan and Florida, and with the International Sunshine Society (ISS). She favored suffrage. Bates died in 1966.

== Biography ==
Clara Nettie Bates was born Traverse City, Michigan, December 25, 1876. Her parents were Thomas Tomlinson and Martha E. Cram Bates. Mrs. Bates served as associate editor of the Grand Traverse Herald since that paper came into possession of Mr. Bates in 1876. There were two other siblings, a brother, George G. Bates, proprietor of the American Poultry Journal of Chicago and vice president of the Herald and Record Company; and a sister, Mabel.

She spent her childhood in a wheelchair, and she was educated by private instruction in the home.

Bates served as editor for six years of the Children's Department in the Grand Traverse Herald with her stories and articles for children appearing each week. She was also a writer of miscellaneous stories and poems appearing in various publications for children.

She conducted the Children's Department of the Sunshine, consisting of 500 active members, representing every U.S. State and Canada. With nearly 10,000 names on the membership list since organization, it was the largest junior ISS in the world, affiliated with the ISS.

Bates served as vice-president, Michigan Woman's Press Association; vice-president, Michigan Audubon Society; director, Michigan State Federation of Women's Clubs; corresponding secretary, 1908–10, and chair of the Bureau of Information, 1910–12; corresponding secretary, Traverse City (Michigan) Bureau of Associated Charities. She was active in local church work, especially the Home Department of the Sunday-school. For many years, she served as the chair, Book Committee, Ladies' Library Association. For six years, she was the corresponding secretary of the Woman's Club. Bates was active locally in the campaign for suffrage in Michigan. In religion, she was a Congregationalist. She was a member of the International Farm Woman's Press Association, Michigan Woman's Press Association, ISS, Traverse City Chapter 147 Order of the Eastern Star, Y.W.C.A., Michigan State Humane Association, Traverse City Federation of Women's Clubs, Traverse City Woman's Club, and the Traverse City Ladles' Library Association.

Bates moved to Fort Pierce, Florida in 1937, where she served as director of the Florida Audubon Society and was a life member of the St. Lucie County Audubon Society. She died in Fort Pierce, November 27, 1966, and was interred at Traverse City, Michigan.
