= Last (crater) =

Crater on the Moon

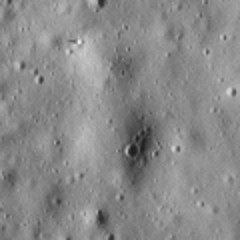
- Apollo 15 panoramic camera image. The LM Falcon is visible as a dot casting a shadow to the left near the upper left corner.
- Coordinates: 26.13°N 3.64°E
- Diameter: 150 m
- Eponym: Astronaut-named feature

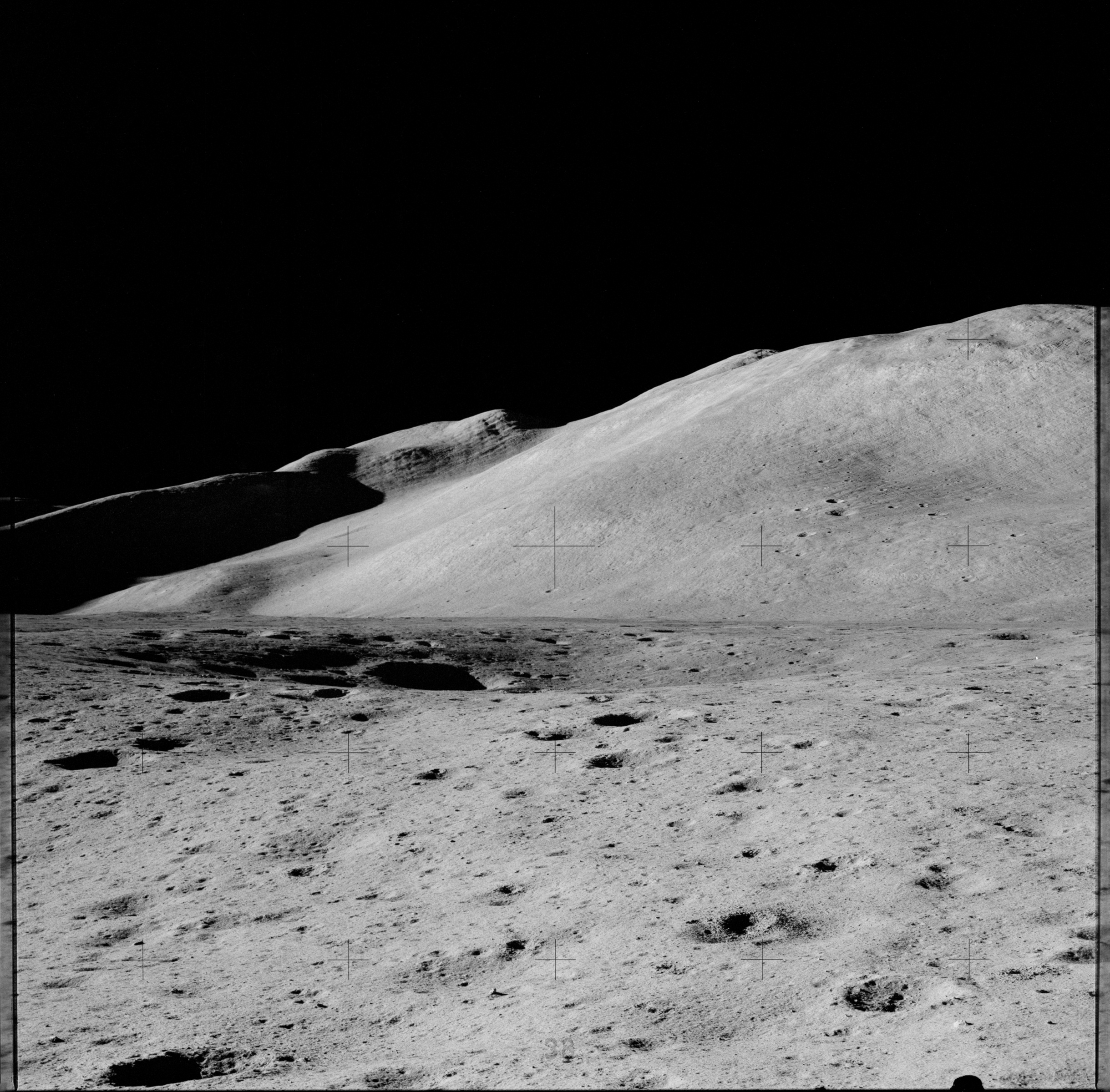
View from the top of LM Falcon (during the Stand-up EVA shortly after landing) facing south towards Mons Hadley Delta and Silver Spur on the horizon, with Last crater in the foreground

Last is a feature on Earth's Moon, a crater in the Hadley–Apennine region. Astronauts David Scott and James Irwin landed the Lunar Module Falcon on the northern edge of it in 1971, on the Apollo 15 mission.

Last crater is located approximately 2 km east of Hadley Rille and approximately 1 km northwest of Index, the intended landing point.

The name of the crater was formally adopted by the IAU in 1973.
