= Theodore Frelinghuysen Seward =

American musician

Theodore F. Seward
- Seward circa 1889
- Born: January 25, 1835; Florida, Orange County, New York
- Died: August 30, 1902 (aged 67); East Orange home of daughter
- Education: Institute at Florida, New York, Normal Musical Institutes at North Reading
- Occupations: Organist; Music educator Composer; Hymnodist
- Spouse: Mary Holden Coggeshall Seward (m. 1860)
- Children: 3
- Relatives: William H. Seward, second cousin

Theodore Frelinghuysen Seward (January 25, 1835 – August 30, 1902) was the Founder of the Brotherhood of Christian Unity and the Don't Worry Club.

== Life and career ==
He was born in Florida, Orange County, New York. He left his father's farm at the age of eighteen to study music under Lowell Mason and Thomas Hastings, became organist of a church in New London, Connecticut, in 1857, and in Rochester, New York, in 1859, moved to New York City in 1867, and conducted the "Musical Pioneer," and afterward the New York "Musical Gazette." He first became interested in the tonic sol-fa system during a visit to England in 1869, and on his return worked to introduce the method without adopting the notation. He then took charge of the performances of the Fisk Jubilee Singers, wrote down more than one hundred of their plantation melodies, and, while making the tour of Europe with them, in 1875–1876. became more impressed with the advantages of the new system of musical instruction. After a course of study at the Tonic sol-fa college in London, he returned to the United States in 1877, to establish the system. Besides writing on the subject for many religious and educational journals, and lecturing before gatherings of teachers, he has edited the "Tonic Sol-Fa Advocate" and the "Musical Reform," taught the system in classes and public schools, and prepared a series of textbooks. He was the founder of the American tonic sol-fa Association, and of the American vocal music association. He died in East Orange, New Jersey.

William H. Seward was his second cousin.

== Publications ==
- "The Pestalozzian Music-Teacher" (New York, 1871) with Lowell Mason
- "The Sunnyside Glee-Book" (New York, 1866)
- "Temple Choir" (1867) with Lowell Mason
- "Coronation" (1872)
