= Directory =

Directory may refer to:

- Directory (computing), or folder, a file system structure in which to store computer files
- Directory (OpenVMS command)
- Directory service, a software application for organizing information about a computer network's users and resources
- Directory (political), a system under which a country is ruled by a college of several people who jointly exercise the powers of a head of state or head of government
  - French Directory, the government in revolutionary France from 1795 to 1799
  - Provisional All-Russian Government, a short-lived, anti-Communist government formed during the Russian Civil War, known as "the Directory"
  - Directorate of Ukraine, the government in Ukraine from 1918 to 1920 during Polish–Ukrainian War and Ukrainian–Soviet War
- Business directory, a listing of information about suppliers and manufacturers
- City directory, a listing of residents, streets, businesses, organizations or institutions, giving their location in a city
- Telephone directory, a book which allows telephone numbers to be found given the subscriber's name
- Web directory, an organized collection of links to websites
- Melway Perth, a western Australian road map

== See also ==
- Director (disambiguation)
- Directorate (disambiguation)
- Index (disambiguation)
