= List =

Ordered listing of items in a collection

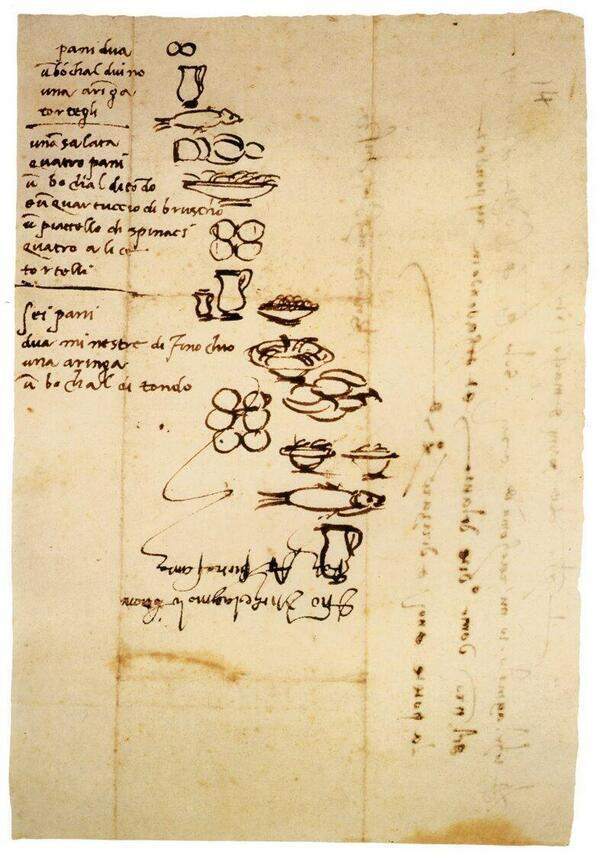
Shopping list drawn in 1518 by Michelangelo for an illiterate servant

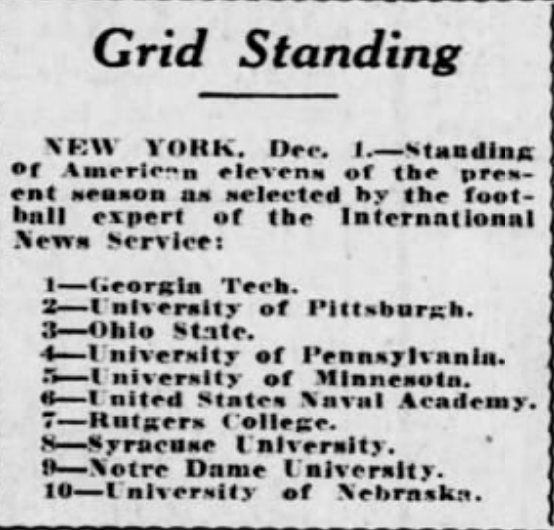
1917 list of the top ten college football teams, in the opinion of a sports expert

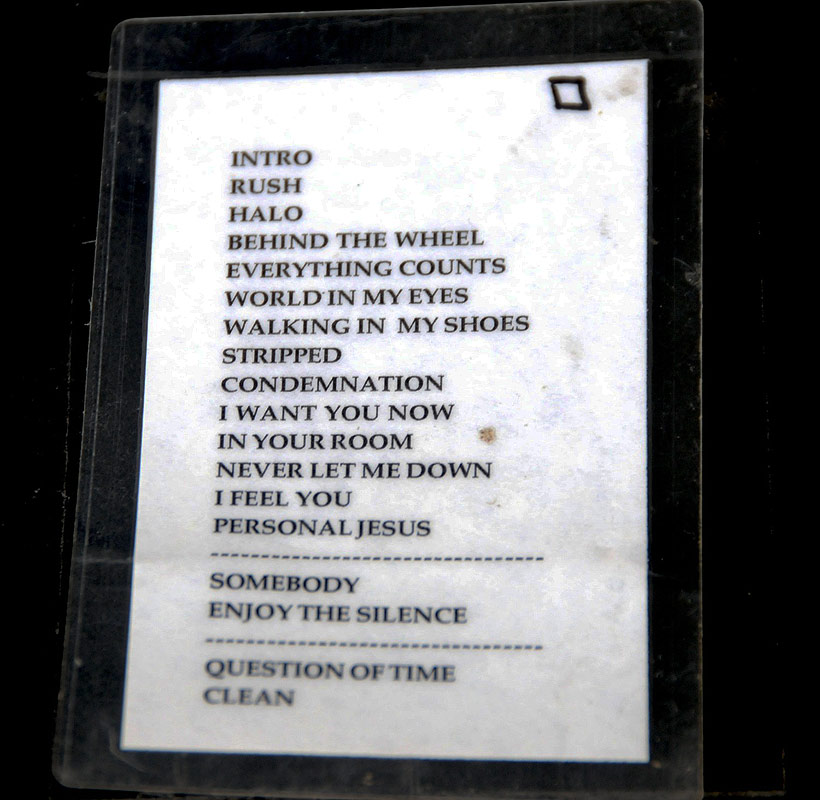
Laminated Depeche Mode set list

A list is a set of discrete items of information collected and set forth in some format for utility, entertainment, or other purposes. A list may be memorialized in any number of ways, including existing only in the mind of the list-maker, but lists are frequently written down on paper, or maintained electronically. Although lists may be made for entertainment, lists are "most frequently a tool".

== Purpose ==
It has been observed that, with a few exceptions, "the scholarship on lists remains fragmented". In 2009, David Wallechinsky, a co-author of The Book of Lists, described the attraction of lists as being a response to "an era of overstimulation, especially in terms of information", further asserting that "lists help us in organizing what is otherwise overwhelming". Philologist and literary scholar Lucie Doležalová has noted that "one does not read but only uses a list: one looks up the relevant information in it, but usually does not need to deal with it as a whole".

While many lists have practical purposes, such as memorializing needed household items, lists are also created purely for entertainment, such as lists put out by various music venues of the "best bands" or "best songs" of a certain era. Such lists may be based on objective factors such as record sales and awards received, or may be generated entirely from the subjective opinion of the writer of the list, or by a survey of a group of people considered experts on the subject. Musicologist David V. Moskowitz notes:

There are now top 100 or top 10 lists of a great variety within the music industry and its associated media. Rolling Stone issues top 100 lists of albums, songs, guitarists, and bass players. Guitar Player and Bass Player magazines contain similar lists as do other types of music magazines. This type of "best of" list ... is based on a degree of opinion. Certainly, each "best of" list is based in some type of more scientific method than simple opinion, but this varies from list to list. Other "best of" lists are even more subjective, essentially coming down to a nonscientific approach to a single person's opinion. Lists of this sort still appear in mainstream media, such as Billboard magazine's "Top 30 Breakup Songs".

The practice of ordering a list evaluating things so that better items on the list are ahead of less good items is called ranking. Lists created for the purpose of ranking a subset of an indefinite population (such as the top 100 of the thousands of bands that have performed in a given genre) are almost always presented as round numbers. Studies have determined that a list of items falling within a round number has a substantial psychological impact, such that "the difference between items ranked No. 10 and No. 11 feels enormous and significant, even if it's actually quite minimal or unknown". The same list may serve different purposes for different people. A list of currently popular songs may provide the average person with suggestions for music that they may want to sample, but to a record company executive, the same list would indicate trends regarding the kinds of artists to sign to maximize future profits.

== Organizing principles ==
Lists may be organized by a number of different principles. For example, a shopping list or a list of places to visit while vacationing might each be organized by priority (with the most important or most desired items at the top and least important or least desired at the bottom), or by proximity, so that following the list will take the shopper or vacationer on the most efficient route.

A list may also completely lack any principle of organization, if it does not serve a purpose for which such a principle is needed. An unsorted list is one "in which data items are placed in no particular order with respect to their content; the only relationships between data elements consist of the list predecessor and successor relationships". For example, in her book, Seriously... I'm Kidding, comedian Ellen DeGeneres provides a list of acknowledgements, notes her difficulty in determining how to order the list, and ultimately writes: "This list is in no particular order. Just because someone is first doesn't mean they're the most important. It doesn't mean they're not the most important either". A list that is sorted by some principle may be said to be following a ranking or sequence.

Items on a list are often delineated by bullet points or a numbering scheme.

== Kinds of lists ==
Kinds of lists used in everyday life include:

- Shopping list: a list of items needed to be purchased by a shopper, such as a list of groceries to be purchased on the next visit to the grocery store (a grocery list)
- To-do list or Task list: a list or "backlog" of pending tasks
- Checklist: a type of job aid used in repetitive tasks to reduce failure by compensating for potential limits of human memory and attention
- Roster: a list of people scheduled to participate in a task, such as employees of a company, or, more specifically, professional athletes set to participate in a specific sporting event
- Wish list, an itemization of goods or services that a person or organization desires

Many highly specialized kinds of lists also exist. For example, a table of contents is a list of the chapters or other features of a written work, usually at the beginning of that work, and an index is a list of concepts or terms found in such a work, usually at the end of the work, and usually indicating where in the work the concepts or terms can be found. A track list is a list of songs on an album, and set list is a list of songs that a band will regularly play in concerts during a tour. A word list is a list of the lexicon of a language (generally sorted by frequency of occurrence either by levels or as a ranked list) within some given text corpus, serving the purpose of vocabulary acquisition.

Many connoisseurs or experts in particular areas will assemble "best of" lists containing things that are considered the best examples within that area. Where such lists are open to a wide array of subjective considerations, such as a list of best poems, best songs, or best athletes in a particular sport, experts with differing opinions may engage in lengthy debates over which items belong on the list, and in which order.

=== Shopping lists ===
A shopping list, or grocery list when specifically for food items, is a list of items that an individual intends to purchase. Consumers often prepare grocery lists for purchases on their next store visit. There are surviving examples of Roman and Bible-era shopping lists.

The shopping list may take the form of a simple scrap of paper or a more elaborate format. Magnetic notepads are commonly used to maintain shopping lists within the household, often affixed to refrigerators or other metal surfaces. but any magnetic clip with scraps of paper can be used to achieve the same result. Additionally, certain shopping carts are equipped with small clipboards designed to hold written shopping lists during use.

Use of shopping lists may be correlated to personality types. There are "demographic differences between list and non list shoppers; the former are more likely to be female, while the latter are more likely to be childless." Remembering a shopping list is a standard experiment in psychology. Shopping with a list is a commonly employed behavioral weight loss guideline designed to reduce food purchases and therefore food consumption. Studies are divided on the effectiveness of this technique.

Some studies show approximately 40% of grocery shoppers use shopping lists, while other studies show 61–67% use lists. Of the items listed, 80% were purchased. However, listed items only accounted for 40% of total items purchased. Use of shopping lists clearly impact shopping behaviour: "Written shopping lists significantly reduce average expenditure."

=== Task lists ===
A task list (also called a to-do list or "things-to-do") is a list of tasks to be completed, such as chores or steps toward completing a project. It is an inventory tool which serves as an alternative or supplement to memory. Writer Julie Morgenstern suggests "do's and don'ts" of time management that include mapping out everything that is important, by making a task list. Task lists are also business management, project management, and software development, and may involve more than one list.

When one of the items on a task list is accomplished, the task is checked or crossed off. The traditional method is to write these on a piece of paper with a pen or pencil, usually on a note pad or clip-board. Task lists can also have the form of paper or software checklists. Numerous digital equivalents are now available, including personal information management (PIM) applications and most PDAs. There are also several web-based task list applications, many of which are free.

==== Task list organization ====
Task lists are often diarized and tiered. The simplest tiered system includes a general to-do list (or task-holding file) to record all the tasks the person needs to accomplish and a daily to-do list which is created each day by transferring tasks from the general to-do list. An alternative is to create a "not-to-do list", to avoid unnecessary tasks.

Task lists are often prioritized in the following ways.

- A daily list of things to do, numbered in the order of their importance and done in that order one at a time as daily time allows, is attributed to consultant Ivy Lee (1877–1934) as the most profitable advice received by Charles M. Schwab (1862–1939), president of the Bethlehem Steel Corporation.
- An early advocate of "ABC" prioritization was Alan Lakein, in 1973. In his system "A" items were the most important ("A-1" the most important within that group), "B" next most important, "C" least important. One method of applying the ABC method assigns "A" to tasks to be done within a day, "B" a week, and "C" a month.
- To prioritize a daily task list, one either records the tasks in the order of highest priority, or assigns them a number after they are listed ("1" for highest priority, "2" for second highest priority, etc.) which indicates in which order to execute the tasks. The latter method is generally faster, allowing the tasks to be recorded more quickly.
- Another way of prioritizing compulsory tasks (group A) is to put the most unpleasant one first. When it is done, the rest of the list feels easier. Groups B and C can benefit from the same idea, but instead of doing the first task (which is the most unpleasant) right away, it gives motivation to do other tasks from the list to avoid the first one.

A completely different approach which argues against prioritizing altogether was put forward by British author Mark Forster in his book Do It Tomorrow and Other Secrets of Time Management. This is based on the idea of operating "closed" to-do lists, instead of the traditional "open" to-do list. He argues that the traditional never-ending to-do lists virtually guarantees that some of your work will be left undone. This approach advocates getting all your work done, every day, and if you are unable to achieve it, that helps you diagnose where you are going wrong and what needs to change.

Various writers have stressed potential difficulties with to-do lists such as the following.

- Management of the list can take over from implementing it. This could be caused by procrastination by prolonging the planning activity. This is akin to analysis paralysis. As with any activity, there is a point of diminishing returns.
- To remain flexible, a task system must allow for disaster. A company must be ready for a disaster. Even if it is a small disaster, if no one made time for this situation, it can metastasize, potentially causing damage to the company.
- To avoid getting stuck in a wasteful pattern, the task system should also include regular (monthly, semi-annual, and annual) planning and system-evaluation sessions, to weed out inefficiencies and ensure the user is headed in the direction he or she truly desires.
- If some time is not regularly spent on achieving long-range goals, the individual may get stuck in a perpetual holding pattern on short-term plans, like staying at a particular job much longer than originally planned.

== See also ==
- A-list
- Blacklist/Whitelist
- The Book of Lists
- Difference list
- Directory (disambiguation)
- The Infinity of Lists (2009) by Umberto Eco, on the topic of lists
- Life list
- Linked list
- List (abstract data type), in computer science
- List comprehension
- List of lists of lists
- Outline (list)
- Self-organizing list
- Set (mathematics)
- Short list
- Wait list
- Word list
