= International Sunshine Society =

Philanthropic newspaper club

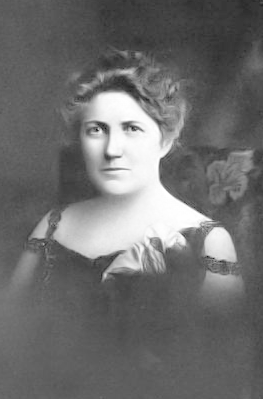
Cynthia May Alden (c.1908)

International Sunshine Society (ISS) was the largest philanthropic newspaper club in the world. It was organized in 1896 by Cynthia May Alden in the New York Recorder newspaper's office largely as a newspaper club with the object "to scatter good cheer, happiness and kindness..." It was incorporated in New York in February 1900, Alden serving as president general.

== History ==
ISS's Dyker Heights Home for Blind Babies in Brooklyn, New York (c. 1908)

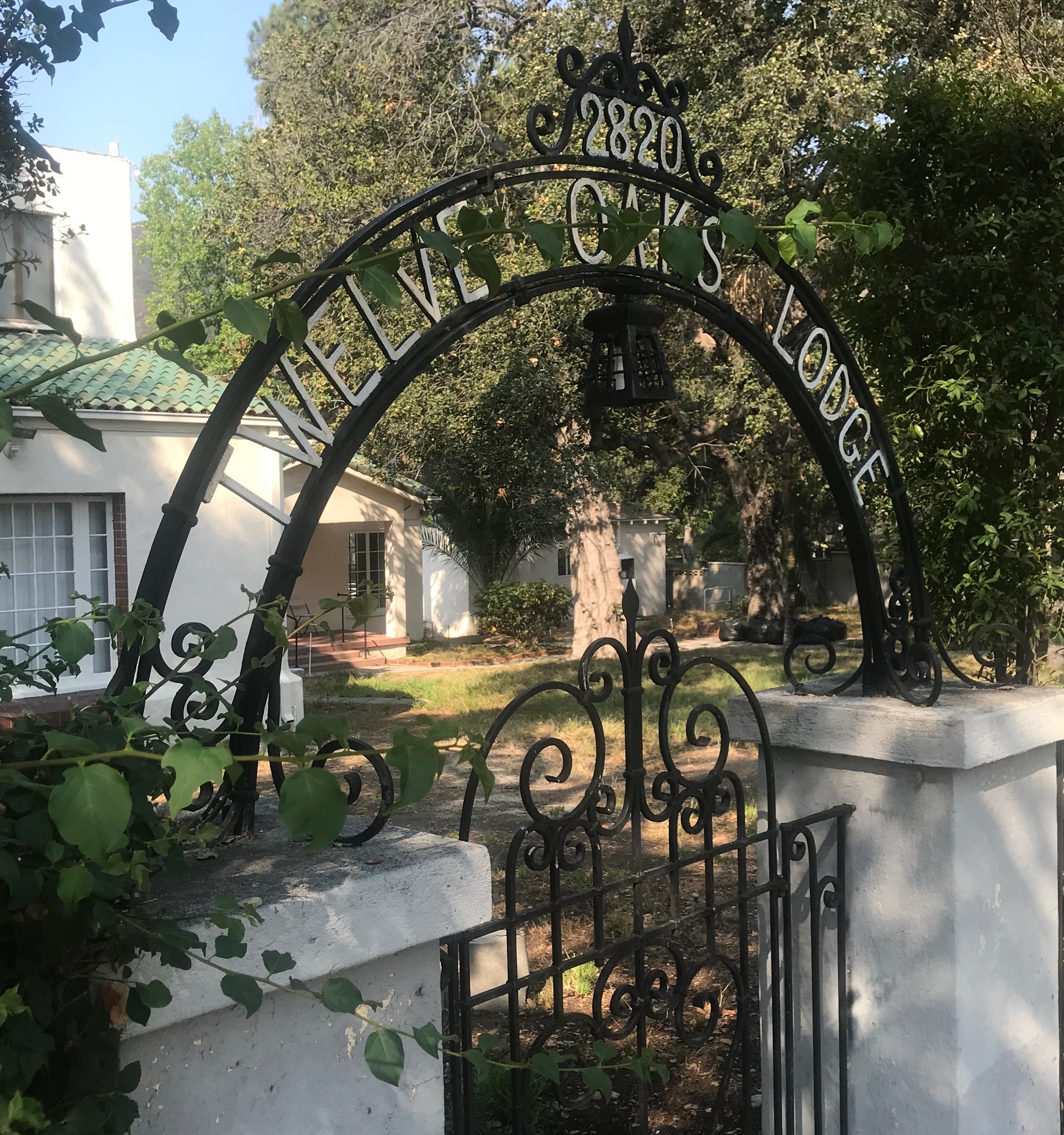
ISS's Twelve Oaks Lodge, Glendale, California

ISS Department for the Blind advertisement (January, 1917)

The development and growth of the sunshine idea began as an association of 18 people living in New York City, who organized for the purpose of passing on Christmas cheer. The object of the society was to incite its members to perform a kind and helpful deed, and to thus bring "sunshine of happiness" to others. The club motto was "Good Cheer". The club colors were yellow and white, yellow being typical of golden sunshine and white emblematic of the purity of purpose that characterized the organization's work.

A report was made occasionally on the "Woman's Page" of the New-York Tribune and thus a "movement" was developed which came to be known initially as the "Tribune Sunshine Society". By 1899, it had grown to be a complete organization with a constitution, a membership of more than 8,000, a badge, a motto ("good cheer"), a floral emblem (the coreopsis), colors (yellow and white), and a society song ("Scatter Sunshine").

A distinguishing fact of the ISS was that sunshine was not charity, which was important to people who might not otherwise accept assistance from charitable institutions.

Sunshine work was regularly reported by approximately 200 newspapers.

The society grew to a membership of over 100,000, by 1903, with 3,000 branches. There were branches in every state of the U.S. as well as in England, Scotland, India, Japan, China, Australia, and New Zealand. Its active membership consisted of the people who desired to brighten life by some kind thought, word, or deed. The membership "fee" was merely a kind act that would bring "sunshine" to someone. The ISS never asked for money as individual dues, and its officers served without pay. But the passing on of articles sent by members required stamps and expressage and stenographers were employed. Therefore, each branch was asked to have its International Day provide funds for this work. Anything from US$1 was acceptable. The same was asked on State Day.

ISS had homes for blind children, a hospital and sanitarium at Bensonhurst, New York, as well as rest homes at Bensonhurst and Lakemont, New York.

== Legacy ==
Some of the organization's records are held by the New-York Historical Society.

== Notable people ==
- Cynthia May Alden (1862–1931), ISS founder and president
- Clara Nettie Bates (1876–1966), editor, writer, and clubwoman
- Clara Estelle Baumhoff (1867–1919), founder, Missouri Division, ISS
- Dimies T. Stocking Denison (1852–1940), ISS vice president, businesswoman and clubwoman
- L. Isabel Heald (1842–1932), president, Maine Division, ISS
- Eliza Happy Morton (1852–1916), educator, textbook author
- Mary C. Seward (1839–1919), poet, composer, and parliamentarian
