= Eliza Happy Morton =

American author and educator

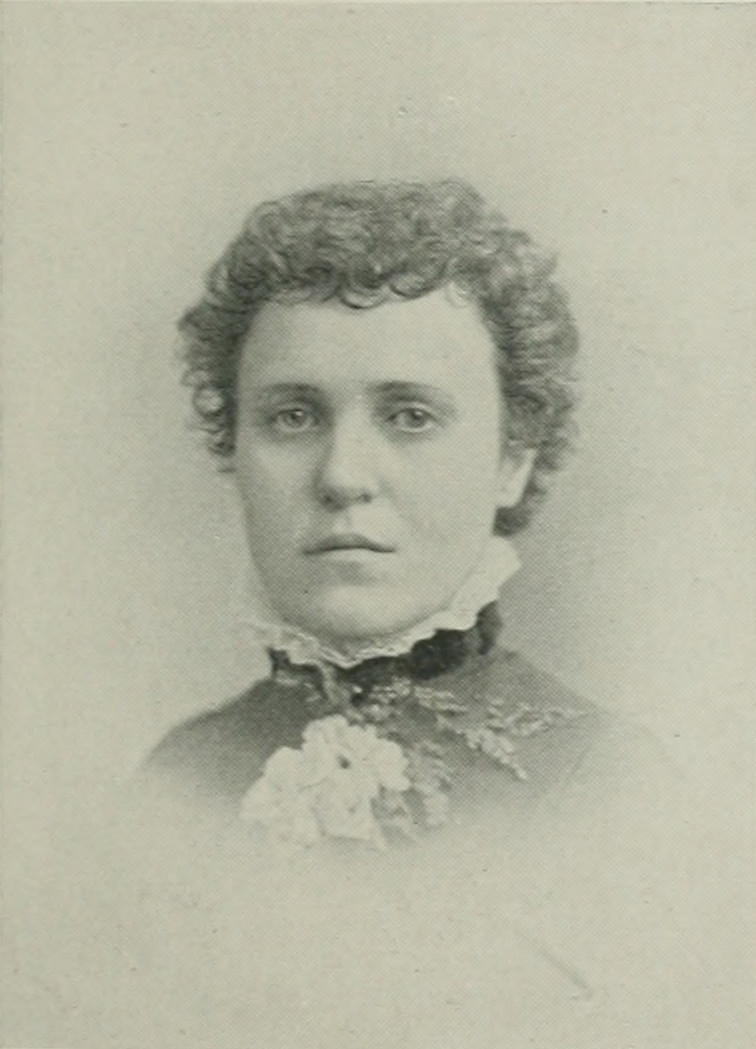
- Portrait photo from A Woman of the Century
- Born: 15 July 1852; Westbrook, Maine, U.S.
- Died: 1916 (aged 63–64)
- Education: Westbrook Seminary
- Occupations: writer; educator
- Writing career
- Genres: non-fiction; poetry; hymn lyrics

Eliza Happy Morton (15 July 1852 – 1916) was an American author and educator from the U.S. state of Maine. She is remembered for her geography textbooks.

== Early years and education ==
Morton was born in Westbrook, Maine, 15 July 1852, the only daughter of William and Hannah Eliza Morton. Her parents were teachers in their earlier years, and she followed in that field. She was educated in Westbrook Seminary and began to teach at the age of 16.

== Career ==
While teaching, Morton was impressed with the fact that many of the old methods of instruction were not productive of the best results, and she began at once to write articles for educational journals, advocating reforms, at the same time putting into practice the principles she advanced and securing results in her work. She taught in various parts of Maine. Her first article for the press was a prose sketch entitled "The Study of Geography."

In 1879, she was asked to be in charge of geographical science in Battle Creek College, Michigan. The idea of preparing a series of geographies gradually assumed shape in her mind, while her name was constantly appearing in print in publications east and west. In 1880, she published a volume of verse entitled Still Waters (Portland, Maine), which was well received. Many of her best poetical productions were written afterwards.

She was also known as a writer of hymns noted for their religious fervor. They were set to music by composers, and the evangelist, Dwight L. Moody, used many of them in his revival work. Among those published in sheet form, the most popular were "The Songs My Mother Sang" and "In the Cleft of the Rock".

After three years at Battle Creek College, Morton withdrew and began to gather material for her geographies. Hundreds of books were examined, leading schools were visited and prominent educators in America and Europe were interviewed as to the best methods of teaching the science. In 1888, her "Elementary Geography" was completed. It was published in Philadelphia as Potters' New Elementary Geography, by Eliza H. Morton. It had a wide sale, and an immediate call was made for an advanced book, which was written under the pressure of poor health, but with care and research. The higher book was also successful.

As a practical educational reformer, Morton won public esteem. Her home was in North Deering, Maine. From 1894 to 1911, she served as business manager, secretary and treasurer of the Maine Tract Society, the Maine branch of Review and Herald Publishing Association of Washington, D.C.

Morton was interested in missionary work and philanthropic work for children. She was a member of the National Geographic Society and International Sunshine Society. Her religious affiliation was as a Seventh-day Adventist.

== Selected works ==
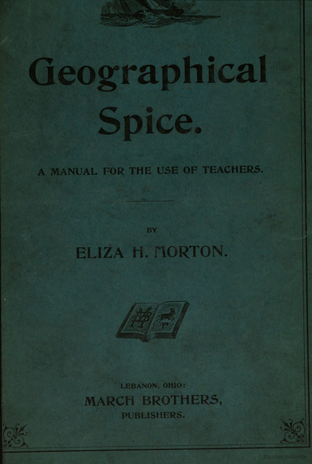
"Geographical Spice", by Eliza Happy Morton, 1893

- 1893, Geographical spice; a manual for the use of teachers
- 1888, Potter's new elementary geography
- 1895, Chalk illustrations for geography classes, a manual for teachers to accompany any series of geographies
- 1895, Potter's advanced geography : mathematical, physical and political
- 1895, Hints to church librarians : a handbook of practical instruction
- 1900, Morton's elementary geography
- 1901, Lessons on the continents
- 1901, Morton's advanced geography
- 1905, Thought, its origin and power
- 1905, Still waters, or, Dreams of rest : a collection of sacred poems
- 1924, Rays of light on the Sabbath question
