= Twelve Oaks Lodge =

Retirement community in California

Coordinates: 34.21043°N 118.24093°W

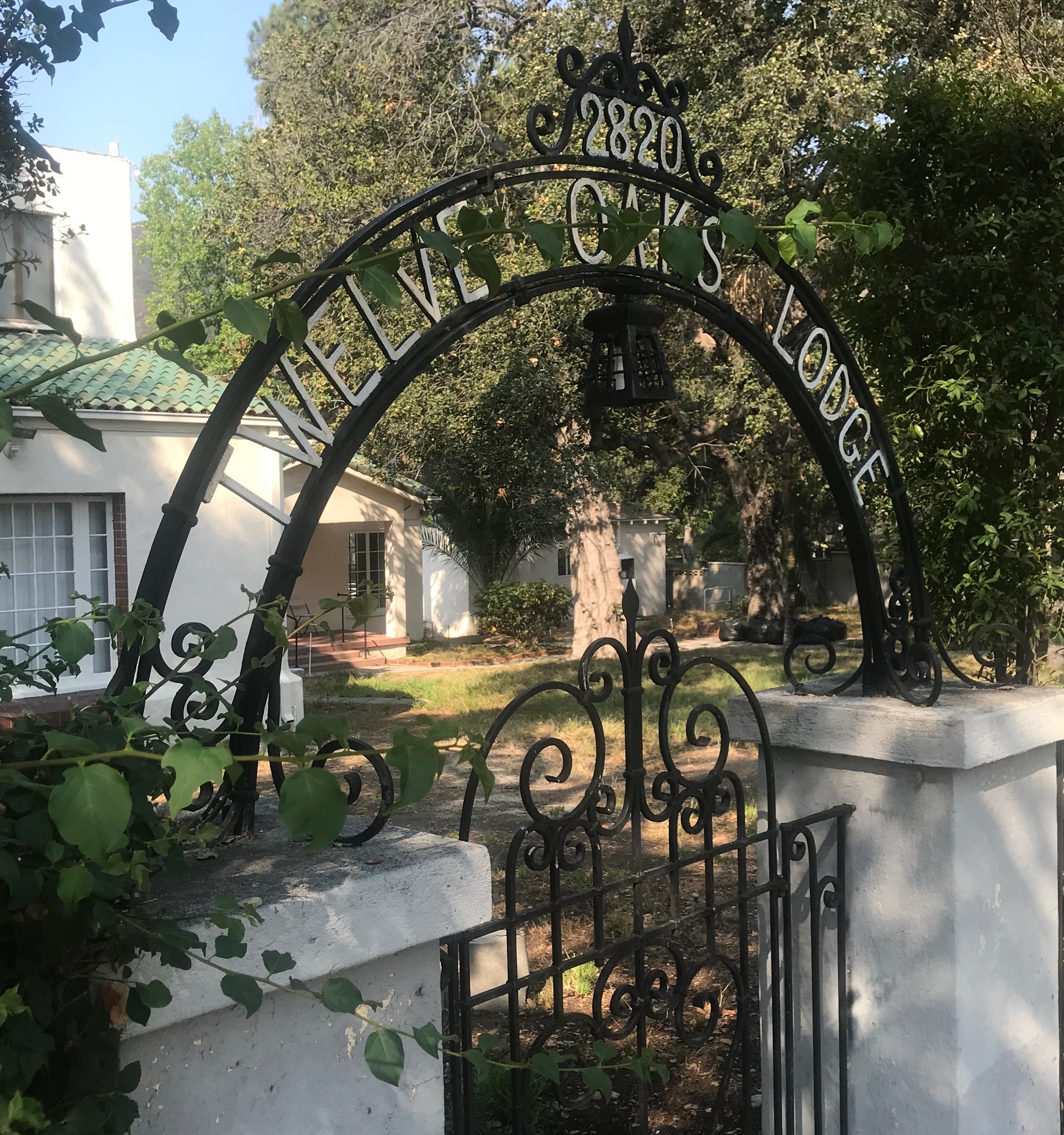
Original entrance

Twelve Oaks Lodge is a retirement community operated by Episcopal Communities & Services (ECS) and is situated on 4.5 acres located in the northern part of Glendale, California.

The community is temporarily Closed, and is projected to reopen in 2030. The newly opened community will feature 104 residences to include, independent living, assisted living and memory care.

== History ==
Twelve Oaks Lodge was conceived by James and Effie Fifield. James Fifield was a successful Midwestern lawyer and businessman who headed several companies and civic organizations. The Fifields spent their winters in California, specifically the Crescenta Valley. They purchased a comfortable 13-room home with oak-shaded acreage in Verdugo City at 2820 Sycamore Avenue. While there, they became involved with a charity group called the International Sunshine Society (ISS), whose aim was to "bring sunshine into the hearts and lives of those less fortunate". The Fifields started a local chapter with the goal of providing low-cost home-like housing for the elderly “who can be made happy by our particular brand of sunshine”. Their dream was to turn their home into an old-people's home. When James Fifield died in 1933, Effie began the process of donating their home and property at no cost to the Verdugo Hills Sunshine Society, and by 1935, it was fully deeded to them.

The Sunshine Society was run by a group of community volunteers. They constructed the various cottages that still stand today, filled them with local elderly who were charged a nominal sum, and provided entertainment and social activity for them as well. Facilities provided by the Sunshine Society included a library, a recreation room, croquet courts and acres of oak-shaded parkland. Their fundraising included other acts of charity in the Crescenta Valley, such as help for local needy families.

In 1963, the National Charity League of Glendale raised over US$50,000 to fund a new retirement home in Glendale. Impressed with the Sunshine Society and Twelve Oaks, they instead decided to donate the entire sum to them, building Stern Hall at Twelve Oaks, a nine-unit residence hall specifically for elderly women. Sensing a kindred spirit in the Charity League, the Sunshine Society decided to merge with the Glendale Charity League, donate Twelve Oaks to them and allow them to operate it, again on a volunteer basis.

The Charity League ran Twelve Oaks until the early 2000s when the facility was donated, once again free of charge, to the non-profit Southern California Presbyterian Homes, which owned several other assisted living facilities. It was felt that a professional organization such as Presbyterian Homes could operate Twelve Oaks more effectively. The Twelve Oaks Foundation, which technically owned the donated property and which held $4.7 million in bequeathed donations, was overseen by the Southern California Presbyterian Homes, and the Board of Directors of the Foundation were replaced with representatives from Presbyterian Homes. In 2011 the Southern California Presbyterian Homes conducted a rebranding campaign and established a DBA as the “be.group”.

== 2013 Closure and 2017 Re-opening ==
In 2013, be.group announced that they would be selling the Twelve Oaks property to a housing developer, and the 50 residents were given 60-day eviction notices. The group said they could no longer afford to run the property. The surrounding community of Crescenta Valley and the former owners, the Glendale chapter of the National Charity League, mounted several campaigns to stop the closure. A website called Friends of 12 Oaks was created in October. A peaceful protest on October 2, 2013 was attended by over 100 people from the local community as well as several of the seniors still at the home. Also in October, the Charity League filed a lawsuit asking a judge to block the closure of the facility and to appoint a receiver to control it.

On September 9, 2013 California State Assemblyman Mike Gatto, 43rd District, requested that the California State Attorney General investigate be.group for improprieties regarding their sale of the donated property, and the legality of transferring a property from a non-profit trust to a presumably for-profit developer.

The original intended purchaser, New Urban West of Santa Monica, California, backed out of the deal amid the community backlash. be.group was looking for another buyer. The facility officially closed on November 1, 2013.

After the four-year closure, much of the Twelve Oaks community has been refreshed and the facility reopened to residents in December 2017. Twelve Oaks Senior Living is licensed for 63 assisted living beds on the 4.5-acre campus. Twelve Oaks continues the 80-year tradition of affordable senior housing in the San Gabriel Valley area. The Twelve Oaks property is owned by Twelve Oaks Foundation. The Twelve Oaks Foundation's top priority is to preserve the low-density, park-like charm of Twelve Oaks while also ensuring the long term economic viability of this unique community resource. The Foundation contracted with Northstar Management to operate the facility.
