= Redirector =

Redirector may refer to:

- Network redirector, provide access to file systems and printers on other computers on a network
- COM port redirector, relay serial data between a "virtual" COM port and a serial device server or modem server on a network
- URL redirection, URLs rewritten prior to processing by a web server

== See also ==
- Redirect (disambiguation)
