= Director (business) =

Title given to the senior management staff of a large organization

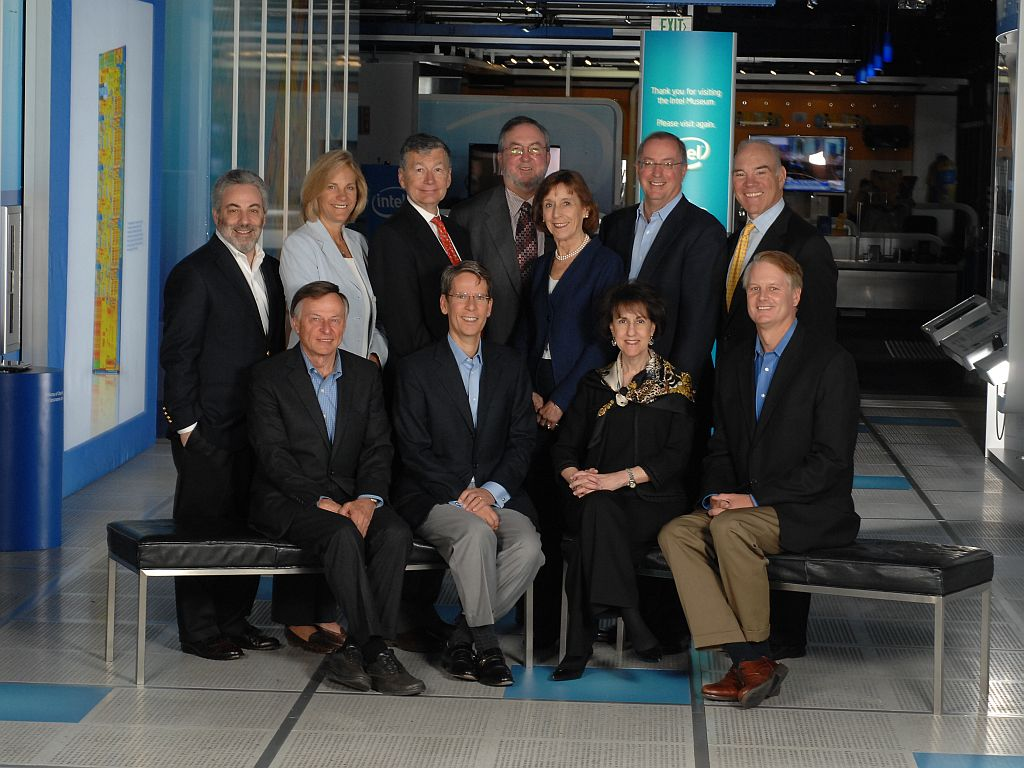
Intel Board of Directors, 2012

The term director is a title given to the senior management staff of businesses and other large organizations.

The term is in common use with two distinct meanings, the choice of which is influenced by the size and global reach of the organization and the historical and geographic context. The term is also used in reference to various technical and legal definitions specific to corporate governance legislation in individual countries.

Thus, a director can be any of:

- A person appointed to act as the most senior manager of the company itself (managing director) or of a key function (finance director, operations director, etc.), in which case the title is analogous to and replaces the "C-Suite" titles, this might be considered as the British English meaning of the word.
- A person from a group of managers who leads or supervises a particular area of a company, which might be considered to be the American English meaning of the word.
- A person holding a "directorship" in a legal sense, who has specific legal duties and responsibilities for management of the company which they have been appointed to the board of.

Within companies that use this term in the latter (American English) sense it would be normal to have directors spread throughout different business functions or roles (e.g. director of human resources). In such a case, the director usually reports directly to a vice president or to the CEO directly in order to let them know the progress of the organization. Large organizations may also have "assistant" or "deputy" directors. In this context, Director commonly refers to the lowest level of executive in an organization, but many large companies use the title of associate director more frequently.

When used by a firm which uses the title director in the British English sense, being termed as an "executive director" would generally imply that the holder is appointed to the board of directors in a legal sense, and holds significant responsibility or a financial stake in the business. By contrast in the American English context "executive director" is roughly equivalent to vice president or senior director in some businesses.

Such companies may also have regional or area directors, with regional director titles tending to be used by companies that are organized by location and have their departments under that, indicating near total responsibility for the operations for their particular country.

== Corporate titles ==
Corporate titles (commonly known as business titles) are titles given to individuals within a business depending on the role they have and which also portray the duties and responsibilities within that specific role. The larger the business, the more titles that are present, such as CEO, COO and executive directors.

People with higher roles within a company are often referred to as "chief" and those who have lower roles within the company are employees who carry out day-to-day tasks. There are many titles within a company such as executive director, managing director, company director and chairman.

The corporate structure consists of four key areas:

- Board of directors- oversees a department and maintains full operational responsibilities area is next to the C-level executives in the corporate jobs hierarchy. They oversee daily tasks of the business or the company.
- Employees- This role is ranked at the bottom of the structure. Employees work on daily tasks and objectives either in a group or individually aiming for that common goal.

== Structuring a board of directors ==
Depending upon the size of an organization or a company, the number of directors can vary. Start-up companies can have a single director, which is the minimum for a private limited company according to the law. However, as organizations and businesses expand, the number of directors can increase because more tasks and responsibilities become present. For example, if the company expands and has more than one department, such as finance, sales, marketing, production and IT, then the business may form a board of directors, with each director overseeing a department and maintaining full responsibility within that department.

A board of directors ensures that a clearly outlined structure is in place which will help the business to work much more efficiently.

Larger businesses and organizations will form a clear board structure as the following:

Chairman - This particular role within the company is often a non executive role that also has the task of overseeing the entire business or organization.

Managing Director (MD) - A managing director is employed by the business, often by the chairman. Other roles include running the business and producing salaries. The managing director works along with the board of directors and oversees the performance of the business, thus reporting back to the chairman.

Executive Directors - A group of executive directors who each play a significant role within the company. They maintain full responsibility over their respective departments such as Finance, Marketing and Sales. Each director manages their department ensuring that tasks and objectives are being met. Executive directors also sit on the board.

Non-executive directors - These advise the business by proposing different forms of strategy and also decide remuneration of the executive directors.

Having a clear structure within the business has a positive impact on the employees and it also helps to organize the business. By having a team of executive directors, employees can report to their executive directors if a problem or an issue occurs.

== Managing director ==
A managing director oversees the performance of the company as a whole and then has the duty to report back to the chairman or board of directors. The chairman or board of directors may set daily and weekly targets, which should be met by the employees that are working within their respective departments. The managing director also has the role to report their progress so the board can evaluate it to see if targets have been achieved.

=== Roles include ===
- Maintaining the overall performance of the company and in particular the departments within.
- Producing and planning strategic operating plans and objectives for the long-term future. Also ensuring all short term targets have been achieved.
- Keeping in regular contact with the board of directors or chairman and to maintain a positive relationship.

== Executive director ==
An executive director within a company or an organization is usually from the board of directors and oversees a specific department within the organization such as Marketing, Finance, Production and IT. The Executive Director must ensure that all employees within his/her department are achieving the objectives which have been set and must also make daily decisions within the department.

=== Roles include ===
- Overseeing their specific department such as Finance, Marketing or Manufacturing.
- Maintaining the role of a specified decision maker within the department.
- Analyzing and evaluating the efficiency of day to day tasks within the departments and ensuring all objectives are being met.

== Company director ==
A company director is one of the employees within a group of managers who maintains a prolific role within an organization and usually has the higher role within an organization. This is mainly because they decide on how to control the business and also make the final and key decisions.

=== Roles include ===
The company director(s) is mainly responsible for:

- Ensuring the company's strategic objectives and plans which have been set are being met.
- Analyzing and monitoring the progress of its employees towards achieving the objectives and targets set.
- Appointing or hiring senior managers for certain departments such as Finance and Marketing.

== Finance director ==
A finance director oversees and maintains full responsibility of the business's finance department. He/she is also responsible in ensuring that the chief executive and the board receive the flow of the financial information. Other responsibilities include producing annual accounts, maintaining control of complete transactions, setting out financial targets and budgets for the business and also managing the companies policies. The finance director may also report to the managing director.

== See also ==
- Director (disambiguation)
- Director-general
- Chief operating officer
- Management
- Non-executive director
- President (corporate title)
- Vice President
