= Indexer =

An indexer may refer to:

- Indexer (programming)
- Torrent indexer or BitTorrent tracker
- Index (disambiguation) § Publishing and library studies, writer of the indexes of literary and non-fiction publications

== See also ==
- Index (disambiguation)
- The Indexer, journal of the Society of Indexers
- "indexer" incategory:"Information science|Document management systems|Metadata|Library science"
