= Director (colonial) =

The title director has been used in colonial administrations not only as a bureaucratic rank and for the members of a board of directors, but also specifically, as in this article, for the head of the colonial administration of a territory (e.g. protectorate) under indirect rule by a chartered company, functionally equivalent to a governor.

Elsewhere, the same function went by the - in principle higher - title director-general, as in Demerara-Essequibo (Dutch Guyana).

== British colonies ==
- From 5 June 1885 the Niger Districts Protectorate (under the United African Company) was administered by Sir George Goldie (1846–1925), until it became on, 10 July 1886, the Niger River Delta Protectorate (under the Royal Niger Company, which appointed two consecutive governors, the second being the same Sir George Goldie).
- The short-lived (1613–1623) English trading post at Hirado (Japan) had a single director: Richard Cocks

== Other colonial powers ==
Director, or rather its equivalent in the colonizer's language, was similarly used elsewhere:

- Directeur, in Caribbean possessions under Dutch WIC (West India Company) administration:
  - Aruba 1833–1848 only three incumbents, the first having been the last commandeur, the last becoming the first gezaghebber
  - Curaçao 1634–1792 and once more 1828–1833 (Isaäk Johannes Rammelman Elsevier), at other times various other titles were in use, mostly governor
- Directeur of Dutch Bengal (a few factories in Dutch India), from 1635 (until 1655, however, filled by the governors of Coromandel) until the 1795 annexation to British India

== Sources and references ==
- World Statesmen- see each present nation
