= The Director (play) =

The Director is a theatrical play by Nancy Hasty that debuted in 2000 at the Arclight Theatre. It ran from February 15 to July 1, 2000.

== Plot ==
Peter is a demanding director with a borderline personality who seeks to create avant-garde theatre. Due to his difficult character and failure to maintain professional relationships, he has been reduced to janitorial work in a rehearsal studio. However, this works well for him because he can use the stage during off hours. Over the course of the play, he manipulates a group of unfortunate actors into a series of acting experiences that gradually become more demented and eventually spin completely out of control."

== Cast ==
Directed by Evan Bergman, set design by John Farrell, lighting design by Steve Rust, costumes by Jill Kliber and produced by Laine Valentino. Starring John Shea as Peter, Tasha Lawrence as the playwright who persuades Peter to direct her play, and Tanya Clarke, Todd Simmons, Shula Van Buren and Warren Press as the studio actors.

Incidental music was Rachmaninoff's Concerto #2.
