= Directorate =

Directorate may refer to:

== Contemporary ==
- Directorates of the Scottish Government
- Directorate-General, a type of specialised administrative body in the European Union
- Directorate-General for External Security, the French external intelligence agency
- Directorate for Inter-Services Intelligence, the premier intelligence service of Pakistan and a division of Pakistan Army
- Directorate General of Civil Aviation (India), India's civil safety watch and responsible for investigation for aviation incidents
- General Intelligence Directorate (Jordan), the Jordanian state intelligence agency
- Intelligence Directorate, the Cuban state intelligence agency
- Veterinary Medicines Directorate, an agency of the Department for Environment, Food and Rural Affairs (United Kingdom)
- Military Intelligence Directorate (Israel), the Israeli Defence Force unit in charge upon collecting information in cooperation with the Mossad
- Unit, the Norwegian directorate for information and communications technology (ICT) and joint services in higher education and research which is part of the Ministry of Education and Research of Norway

== Historical ==
- French Directory or Directorate, one of the French Revolution's governing bodies, 1795–1799
- Directorate of Ukraine, provisional revolutionary state committee of the Ukrainian National Republic, 1918–1920
- Directorate (Russia), the ruling body of the Russian Provisional Government, September–October 1917
- Directorate of Military Intelligence (United Kingdom), a department of the War Office (United Kingdom), disestablished 1964
- Immigration and Nationality Directorate, an agency of the Home Office (United Kingdom), disestablished 2007

== See also ==
- Directorio (disambiguation), Spanish for directorate
- Directorial system, for the term as used in comparative politics
