= Direct Access Test Unit =

Direct Access Test Units (DATUs) are special PSTN phone numbers that terminate at the central office switch in a telephone company's local exchange that provide switchmen and telco technicians with a circuit for testing lines in various ways.

Among the many things a DATU can do are:

- Make certain electrical connections, such as shorting a line's tip to ring, tip to ground, or ring to ground.
- Play certain tones on the line (high tone, low tone) to test the line's audio circuit.
- Monitor the audio circuit on the line if it is in use (though this only provides a scrambled rendition of the line's audio circuit for privacy and security reasons).
- Create and modify certain variables such as counters and timers on the CO switch, as well as adding and modifying exchanges.
- Remove a line from permanent signal holding state.

DATU's are primarily non-published numbers, though they usually have the phone number XXX-9935 (where XXX represents the local exchange). They are password protected for security, though many telcos leave the default password of 1111 set.

In July 2004, New York City phone phreak William Quinn, also known as "decoder", was arrested and charged with accessing Verizon's DATU numbers on over 100 occasions. Verizon subsequently claimed in press releases that it spent $120,000 to change the passwords on all the DATU numbers (it is unclear if this represented Verizon changing the DATU passwords from the default and if so why this had not been done at time of initial installation).
