= Index, West Virginia =

- Unincorporated community
- Location within West Virginia Location within the United States
- Coordinates: 38°52′47″N 80°59′12″W
- Country: United States
- State: West Virginia
- County: Gilmer
- Elevation: 860 ft (260 m)
- Time zone: UTC-5 (Eastern (EST))
  - Summer (DST): UTC-4 (EDT)
- GNIS feature ID: 1540664

Index is an unincorporated community in Gilmer County, West Virginia, United States. Its post office is closed.
