= Deputy Director =

Deputy Director is a job title used in many organizations around the world for a deputy for a director, and may refer to:

- Deputy Director, a general rank below director within His Majesty's Civil Service; see Grading schemes
- Deputy Director of the Central Intelligence Agency
- Deputy Director of the National Security Agency
- Deputy Director of the Federal Bureau of Investigation
- Assistant Deputy Director of National Intelligence for Open Source

== See also ==
- Director (disambiguation)
- Director general
