= Direct connect =

Direct connect may refer to:

- Direct connection (New Jersey), a complex U.S. highway interchange in South Jersey
- Direct Connect (protocol), a file sharing client and protocol
- A protocol used by the program AOL Instant Messenger
- Sprint Direct Connect, a brand name used by Sprint Corporation for its digital push-to-talk service, similar to a walkie-talkie
- Direct Connect is an Australian company related to Lumo Energy
