= Index (crater) =

Crater on the Moon

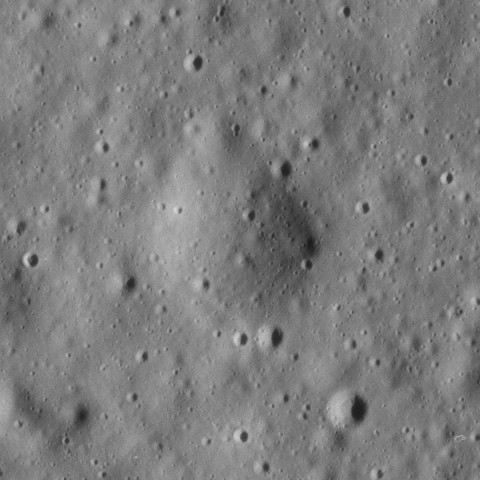
- Apollo 15 panoramic camera image
- Coordinates: 26.10°N 3.66°E
- Diameter: 320 m
- Eponym: Astronaut-named feature

Index is a feature on Earth's Moon, a crater in the Hadley–Apennine region. Astronauts David Scott and James Irwin landed the Lunar Module Falcon northwest of it in 1971, on the Apollo 15 mission, but they did not visit it. They intended to land closer to Index, but actually landed next to Last crater.

Index is the southernmost of a line of four craters which were used by the astronauts as landmarks during descent to the surface. The other three are called Luke, Mark, and Matthew, after three of the four major Gospels of the Bible. They were not allowed to call the crater John due to the fact that atheist Madalyn Murray O'Hair had sued NASA for astronauts reading from Genesis during Apollo 8. The name Index was formally adopted by the IAU in 1973, but the other three crater names were not.
