= Indirect =

Indirect, the opposite of direct, may refer to:

- Indirect approach, a battle strategy
- Indirect DNA damage, caused by UV-photons
- Indirect agonist or indirect-acting agonist, a substance that enhances the release or action of an endogenous neurotransmitter
- Indirect speech, a form of speech
- Indirect costs, costs that are not directly accountable to a particular function or product
- Indirect self-reference, describes an object referring to itself indirectly
- Indirect effect, a principle of European Community Law
- Indirect finance, where borrowers borrow funds from the financial market through indirect means
- Indirection, the ability to reference something in computer programming
- Indirect transmission, infections passing from one host to another via a different species.
