= Directorio =

Directorio is Spanish for Directorate and could refer to:

- Cuban Democratic Directorate, a nongovernmental organization that supports the human rights movement in Cuba.
- Directorio, early 19th century government of Argentina.
