= Index, Missouri =

Extinct hamlet in Missouri, U.S.

Coordinates: 38.5689026°N 94.1357769°W

Index is an extinct town in Cass County, in the U.S. state of Missouri.

Index was platted in 1857. A post office called Index was established in 1874, and remained in operation until 1903.
