= Truman State University Index =

Weekly student newspaper

- Truman State University Index The April 19, 2007 front page of the Truman State University Index
- Type: Weekly student newspaper
- Format: Broadsheet
- Owner: Truman State University
- Publisher: Truman State University
- Editor-in-chief: Grace Potter
- Managing editor: Kaylee O'Dell
- News editor: Vince Jones
- Founded: 1909
- Headquarters: Media Center; Barnett Hall; 100 E. Normal St. Kirksville, MO 63501; United States
- Circulation: 600 Monthly
- Website: Truman Index

The Truman State University Index is a weekly student newspaper distributed at Truman State University and throughout the Kirksville, Missouri community. The publication is entirely student-run and funded mostly through its own advertising revenue. It has published continuously since 1909, and its current circulation is about 4,500.

The Index publishes about 14 issues per academic term for a total of 28 per year, on Thursdays, and does not publish when classes are not in session. An issue usually includes 20 pages.

== Membership ==
Staff members of the Index attend conferences sponsored by the Society of Professional Journalists (SPJ) and College Media Advisers, Inc. and many belong to the Truman chapter of SPJ.

== Recognition ==
The Index has won regional and national awards through SPJ and CMA, including the nationwide Apple Award by College Media Advisers in 2003, 2005, 2006, 2007 and 2009 in its category of best non-daily broadsheet newspaper and national Best in Show award, given by the CMA, in 2006.

The Index has been named a Pacemaker finalist, one of the most prestigious honors bestowed on collegiate media, by the Associated Collegiate Press seven of the last 10 years, in 1997, 1999, 2000, 2002, 2003, 2004 and 2005.

Individual staff members claimed 26 awards at the Missouri CMA conference in April 2007, which earned the Index the sweepstakes award, and 10 Mark of Excellence awards at the regional SPJ conference, also in April.

== Competition ==
Although the Index is published in the same micropolitan area as the Kirksville Daily Express and they are therefore in nominal competition, the two newspapers often feature different content and focus. The Daily Express is published six times per week, its staff is smaller and it relies on wire content. The Daily Express also publishes stories relating to high school sports and other local events, while the Index tends to focus on events that relate to the university community.

== Quality standards ==
The Index follows Associated Press (AP) style and maintains an internal stylebook to standardize references to campus and community events, locations, and traditions. Its editorial guidelines also address journalistic ethics.

The online version of The Index is hosted by College Publisher. In addition to viewing each week's stories and accessing an archive, readers can check for updates for breaking news.
