= Thumb index =

Round cut-out in the pages of a publication

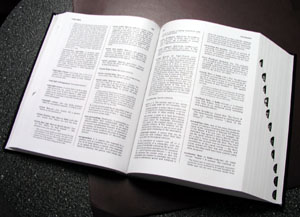
A dictionary with thumb indexes (on the right).

A thumb index, also called a cut-in index, index notch, thumb cut, or thumb tab, is a round cut-out in the pages of dictionaries, encyclopedias, Bibles and other large religious books, and various sectioned, often alphabetic, reference works, used to locate entries starting at a particular letter or section. The individual notches are called thumb cuts and enable the reader to turn to any section they want.

Several ways to achieve this indexing effect were invented and patented in the 1970s by Arthur S. Friedman, a printing engineer in New York. Charles Halbert Denison also patented the marginal thumb indexing system for bookkeeping, with his business taken over by his wife Dimies T. Stocking Denison after his death in 1911.

== See also ==
- Index (publishing)
