= Cynthia May Alden =

American writer (1862–1931)

Cynthia Westover Alden
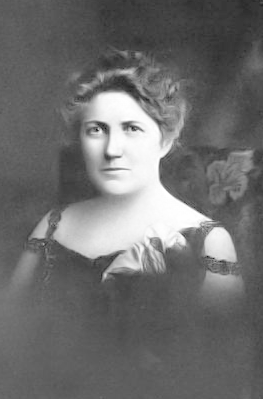
- circa 1908
- Born: Cynthia May Westover; May 31, 1862; Afton, Iowa
- Died: January 8, 1931 (aged 68); Brooklyn, New York (home)
- Other names: Kate Kensington (pen name)
- Spouse: John B. Alden (m. 1896)

Cynthia May Westover Alden (May 31, 1862 – January 8, 1931), also known as Cynthia W. Alden and Cynthia M. Westover, was an American journalist, author, inventor, and New York City municipal employee.

== Early life and education ==
She was born in Afton, Iowa, the daughter of Oliver S. Westover and Lucilda (Lewis) Westover. She was the grand-daughter of Alexander Campbell, a leader of the Campbellite religious reform movement. Her mother died when she was very young, and during her childhood she often accompanied her father, a geologist and miner, on prospecting expeditions throughout the American west. The second of her three books, Bushy (1896), was based on these childhood experiences. She graduated from University of Colorado Boulder with a teaching degree and also studied at the Denver Business College.

== Career ==
=== Municipal employment ===
Alden moved to New York City in 1882 to further her musical education in hopes of becoming an opera singer; she later sang as a soloist in church choirs. In 1887 she was appointed a New York inspector of customs, in which position she was involved in the seizure of smuggled goods. She learned French, German, Italian, and Spanish in order to communicate better with people she came in contact with through her job.

Beginning in 1890, Alden worked for two years as secretary to the New York City Commissioner of Street Cleaning. During this period, she invented a street-cleaners' cart, to make life easier for the street sweepers and for their horses, which at that time had to pull heavy wagons. The cart was small enough for the sweepers to handle themselves, and it had a self-dumping feature so that it could be emptied directly onto the trash barges, bypassing the horse-drawn wagons. For this invention, the Parisian Academy of Inventors awarded Alden a gold medal and made her an honorary member.

For a time she was also employed at the New York Museum of Natural History but left this job to take up journalism.

=== Journalism ===
Alden entered journalism in 1894 as editor of the woman's department at the New York Recorder. In 1897 she moved to the New York Tribune, where she held the same position.

In 1899, Alden accepted a position on the editorial staff of the Ladies' Home Journal, continuing there until 1909. Although the journal was based in the Midwest, she continued to reside in New York City.

=== International Sunshine Society ===
During her three years with the Tribune, Alden planned and founded the International Sunshine Society, serving as its president-general for the rest of her life, with Dimies T. Stocking Denison as her vice-president. It started with Alden's practice of sending Christmas cards and gifts to shut-ins, and she slowly expanded it, first to her circle of fellow writers, and later to a membership that peaked at half a million. The focus also shifted to establishing institutions to serve the blind, funded mainly by donations from members as there were no membership dues. The Sunshine Society set up a sanatorium in Bensonhurst for blind children in 1902 (which became Harbor Hospital fifteen years later), a nursery and kindergarten for blind children in Brooklyn (1905), and the Sunshine Arthur Home for blind babies in Summit, New Jersey (1910). It later opened homes for the elderly and operated schools for orphans, lunchrooms for working women, libraries, and summer camps. The society also championed legislation in aid of the blind in a total of 18 states.

== Personal life ==
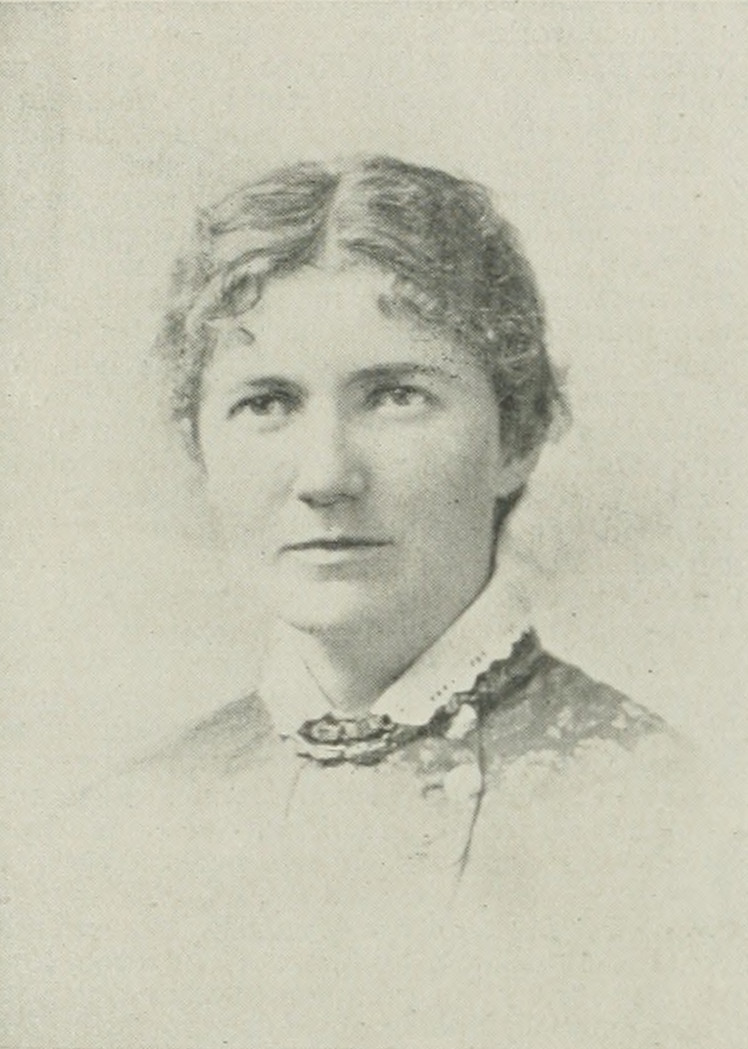
Portrait from A Woman of the Century, 1893

In 1896, she married John Alden, who would later become the editor of the Brooklyn Eagle. Their house was only 8 feet wide and became known as "the littlest house in Brooklyn".

Following her death in New York City, and subsequent cremation, John placed her ashes at the foot of a tree planted in her honor in New York's Central Park.

== Publications ==
- Manhattan: Historic and Artistic (1892, with Carolyn Faville Ober)
- Bushy: A Romance Founded on Fact (1896, illustrated by J.A. Walker)
- The First Book of Song and Story (1903, introduction only)
- The Ways of Earning Money: A Book for Women (1904)
- The Baby Blind (1915)
