= John Young (astronaut) =

American astronaut and lunar explorer (1930–2018)

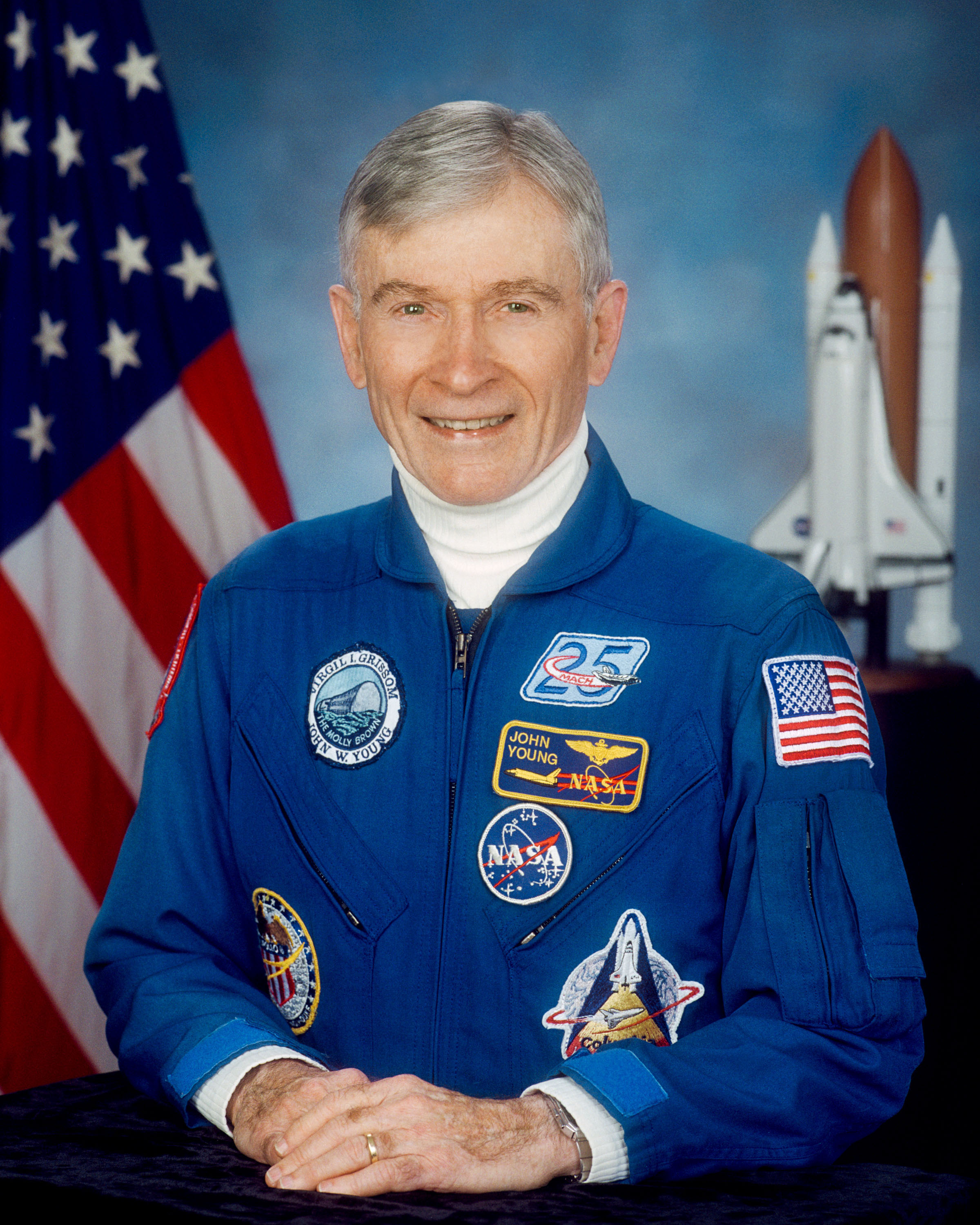
- Young in 2002
- Born: John Watts Young; September 24, 1930; San Francisco, California, U.S.
- Died: January 5, 2018 (aged 87); Houston, Texas, U.S.
- Resting place: Arlington National Cemetery
- Education: Georgia Institute of Technology (BS)
- Spouse(s): Barbara White (m. 1955; div. 1971) Susy Feldman (m. 1971)
- Children: 2
- Awards: Distinguished Flying Cross; Congressional Space Medal of Honor; NASA Distinguished Service Medal
- Space career

NASA astronaut
- Rank: Captain, USN
- Time in space: 34d 19h 39m
- Selection: NASA Group 2 (1962)
- Total EVAs: 3
- Total EVA time: 20h 14m
- Mission: Gemini 3; Gemini 10; Apollo 10; Apollo 16; STS-1; STS-9
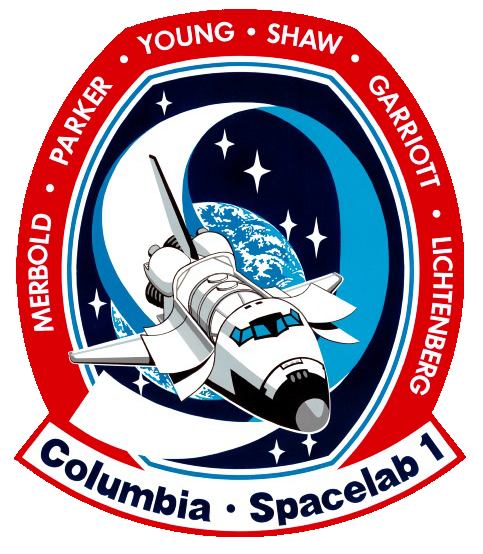
- Mission insignia
- Retired: December 31, 2004

Signature
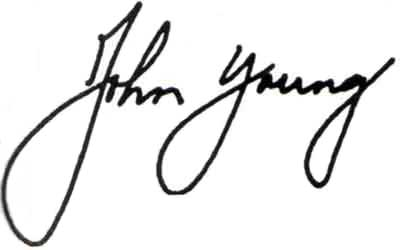

John Watts Young (September 24, 1930 – January 5, 2018) was an American astronaut, naval officer and aviator, test pilot, and aeronautical engineer. He became the ninth person to walk on the Moon as commander of the Apollo 16 mission in 1972.

Before becoming an astronaut, Young received his Bachelor of Science degree in aeronautical engineering from the Georgia Institute of Technology and joined the U.S. Navy. After serving at sea during the Korean War he became a naval aviator and graduated from the U.S. Naval Test Pilot School. As a test pilot, he set several world time-to-climb records. Young retired from the Navy in 1976 with the rank of captain.

In 1962, Young was selected as a member of NASA Astronaut Group 2. He flew on the first crewed Gemini mission (Gemini 3) in 1965, and then commanded the 1966 Gemini 10 mission. In 1969, he flew as command module pilot on Apollo 10, and became the first person to orbit the Moon alone. In 1972, he commanded Apollo 16 and spent three days on the lunar surface exploring the Descartes Highlands with Charles Duke. Young also commanded STS-1 in 1981, the Space Shuttle program's first launch, and STS-9 in 1983, both of which were on Columbia.

Young is the only astronaut to have flown in four different classes of NASA spacecraft: Gemini, the Apollo command module, the Apollo Lunar Module, and the Space Shuttle.

He was one of only two astronauts, along with Ken Mattingly, his command module pilot during the Apollo 16 mission, to fly on both an Apollo mission and a Space Shuttle mission, and the only astronaut to walk on the Moon and fly on the Space Shuttle. Young served as Chief of the Astronaut Office from 1974 to 1987, and retired from NASA in 2004, after 42 years of service.

== Early years and education ==
John Watts Young was born at St. Luke's Hospital in San Francisco, California, on September 24, 1930, to William Hugh Young, a civil engineer, and Wanda Young (née Howland). His father lost his job during the Great Depression, and the family moved to Cartersville, Georgia, in 1932. In 1936, the family moved to Orlando, Florida, where he attended Princeton Elementary School. When Young was five years old, his mother was diagnosed with schizophrenia and taken to Florida State Hospital. Soon after the attack on Pearl Harbor, Young's father joined the U.S. Navy as a Seabee and left Young and his younger brother Hugh in the care of a housekeeper. Young's father returned after the war and became a plant superintendent for a citrus company. Young attended Orlando High School, where he competed in football, baseball, and track and field, before he graduated in 1948.

Young attended the Georgia Institute of Technology on a Naval ROTC scholarship. He completed a midshipman cruise aboard USS Missouri, where he worked alongside his future Apollo 10 crewmate Thomas P. Stafford, and another aboard USS Newport News. His senior year, Young served as regiment commander of his ROTC detachment. He was a member of the honor societies Scabbard and Blade, Tau Beta Pi, Omicron Delta Kappa, Phi Kappa Phi, ANAK Society, and the Sigma Chi fraternity. In 1952, Young graduated second in his class with a Bachelor of Science degree in Aeronautical Engineering and was commissioned as an ensign in the U.S. Navy on June 6, 1952.

== Navy service ==
Young applied to become a naval aviator, but was selected to become a gunnery officer aboard USS Laws out of Naval Base San Diego. He completed a Pacific deployment as a fire control and division officer on Laws in the Sea of Japan during the Korean War. In May 1953, he received orders to flight school at Naval Air Station Pensacola. Young first flew the SNJ-5 Texan in flight school and was then selected for helicopter training. He flew the HTL-5 and HUP-2 helicopters and completed helicopter training in January 1954. Young returned to flying the SNJ-5, and advanced to fly the T-28 Trojan, F6F Hellcat, and the F9F Panther. He graduated from flight school and received his aviator wings in December 1954.

After flight school, Young was assigned to Fighter Squadron 103 (VF-103) at NAS Cecil Field to fly the F9F Cougar. In August 1956, he deployed with the Sixth Fleet aboard USS Coral Sea to the Mediterranean Sea. Young flew during the Suez Crisis, but did not fly in combat. His squadron returned in February 1957, and later that year began the transition to fly the F8U Crusader. In September 1958, VF-103 deployed with the Sixth Fleet on USS Forrestal to the Mediterranean Sea. In January 1959, Young was selected to be in Class 23 at the United States Naval Test Pilot School and returned home from deployment.

In 1959, Young graduated second in his class and was assigned to the Armament Division at the Naval Air Test Center. He worked alongside future astronaut James A. Lovell Jr. and tested the F-4 Phantom II fighter weapons systems. In 1962, he set two world time-to-climb records in the F-4, reaching 3,000 m (9,800 ft) in 34.52 seconds and 25,000 m (82,000 ft) in 227.6 seconds. In 1962, Young was assigned to fly with Fighter Squadron 143 (VF-143) until his selection as an astronaut in September 1962.

Young retired from the Navy as a captain in September 1976. He had 24 years of service.

== NASA career ==
In September 1962, Young was selected to join NASA Astronaut Group 2. Young and his family moved to Houston, Texas, and he began his astronaut flying, physical, and academic training. After he completed his initial training, Young was assigned to work on the environmental control system and survival gear. Young's team selected the David Clark Company G3C pressure suit, and he helped develop the waste disposal and airlock development systems.

=== Project Gemini ===
==== Gemini 3 ====
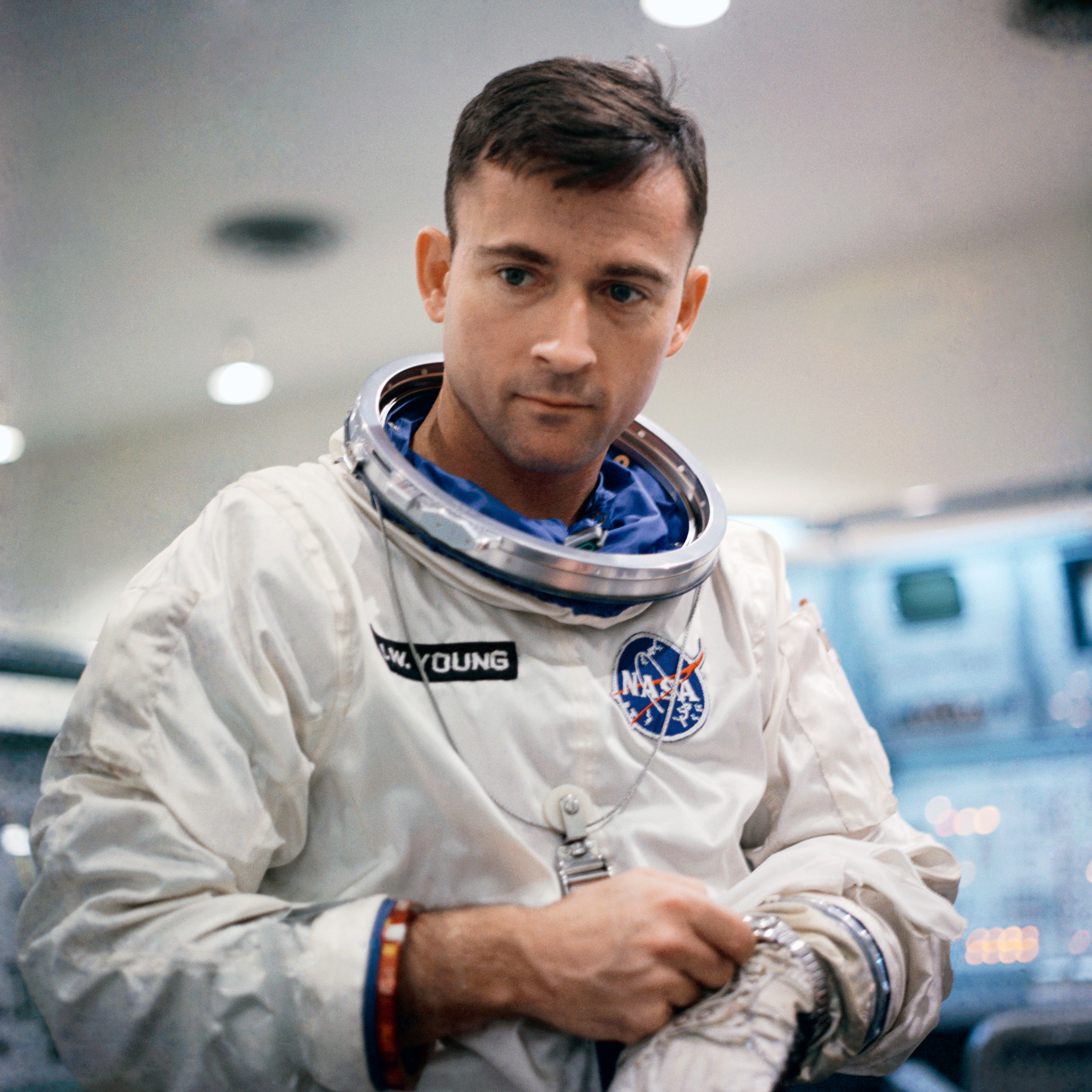
Young during a pre-launch exercise of Gemini 3

In April 1964, Young was selected as the pilot of Gemini 3, commanded by Gus Grissom. The crew had originally been Alan Shepard and Thomas P. Stafford, but they were replaced after Shepard was diagnosed with Ménière's disease. The Gemini 3 backup commander was Wally Schirra, with Stafford as the backup pilot. The primary mission of Gemini 3 was to test the ability of the spacecraft to perform orbital maneuvers throughout the flight. Biological experiments were assigned to test the effects of radiation on human blood and microgravity on cell division, and an experiment to test reentry communications was created. Both crews initially trained in simulators at the McDonnell Aircraft Corporation facilities in St. Louis, Missouri, and moved their training when the simulators were set up at the Manned Spacecraft Center and Kennedy Space Center (KSC) in October 1964. Both primary and backup crews participated in Gemini 3's capsule system tests before it left the McDonnell facility. The capsule was brought to the Kennedy Space Center on January 4, 1965, and both crews trained in it from February 14 to March 18. Young advocated for a longer mission than the planned three orbits, but his suggestion was rejected.

On March 23, 1965, Young and Grissom entered their capsule at 7:30 a.m. They conducted their preflight system checkout ahead of schedule but had to delay the launch after there was a leak in an oxidizer line in the Titan II GLV. Gemini 3 launched at 9:24 a.m. from LC-19 and entered in a 122 × 182 km (76 × 113 mi) elliptical orbit. Twenty minutes into flight, Young recognized multiple anomalous system readings and determined that there might be issues with the instrument power supply. He switched from the primary power supply to the backup, which solved the issue. Young successfully completed the radiation experiment on human blood, but Grissom accidentally broke a handle and was unable to complete his assigned experiment on cell division. Gemini 3 successfully conducted its orbital maneuver tests that allowed it to circularize its orbit, change its orbital plane, and lower its perigee to 72 km (45 mi). On the third orbit, Young fired the retrorockets to begin re-entry. The lift the capsule experienced during reentry was less than predicted, and Gemini 3 landed 84 km (52 mi) short of its target area. After the parachutes deployed, the crew shifted the capsule to its landing orientation, which caused both of them to be thrown forward into the instrument panel and damaged the faceplates on their helmets. The crew remained inside the capsule for 30 minutes as they waited for a helicopter to retrieve them, and they and the capsule were successfully recovered aboard USS Intrepid. After the flight, it was discovered that Young had smuggled a corned beef sandwich aboard, which he and Grissom shared while testing food. The House Committee on Appropriations launched a hearing regarding the incident, and some members argued that the two astronauts had disrupted the scheduled food test.

==== Gemini 10 ====
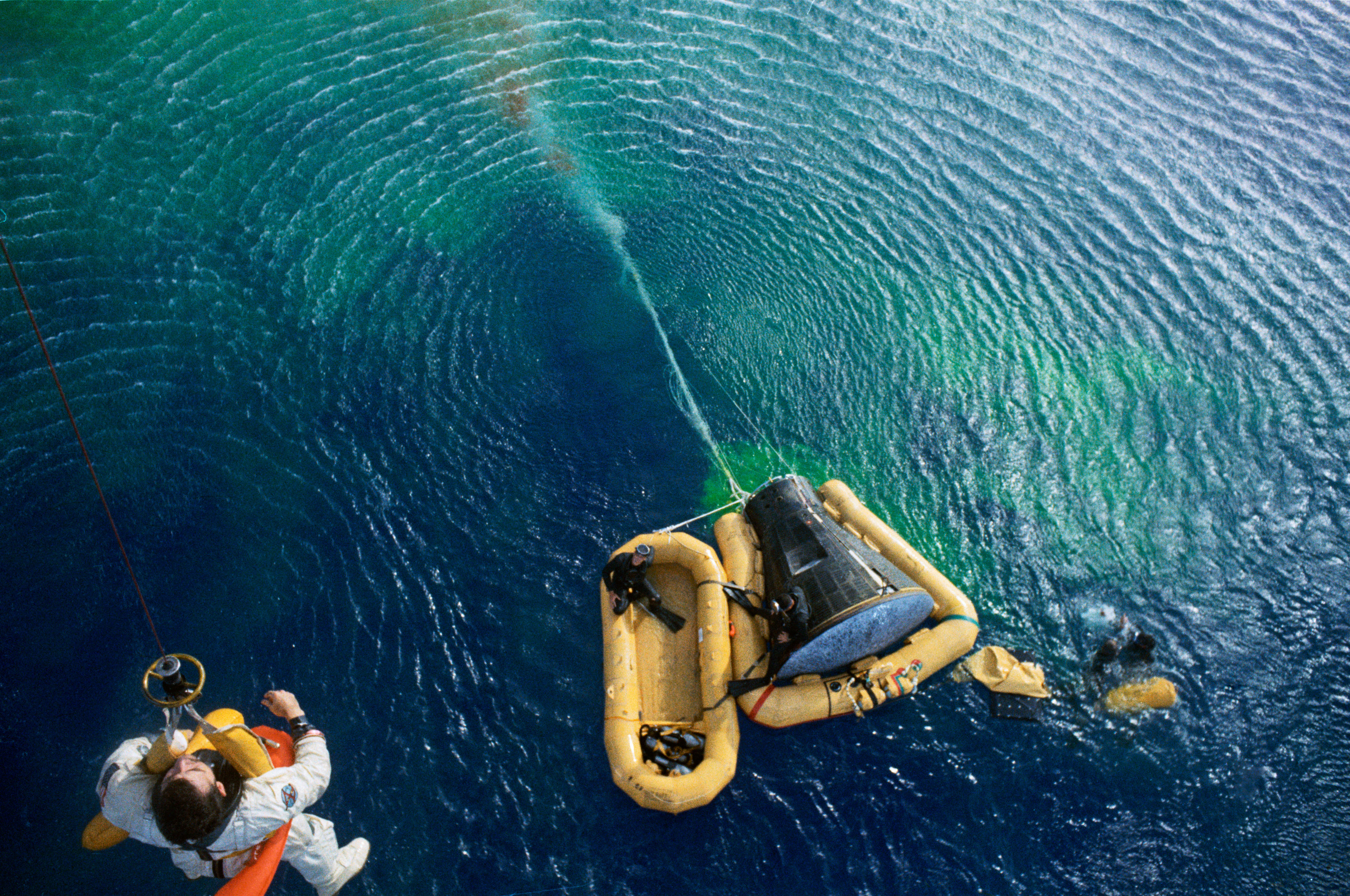
Young being hoisted from the capsule following his Gemini 10 flight

After Gemini 3, Grissom and Young were assigned as backup commander and pilot for Gemini 6. On January 24, 1966, Young and Michael Collins were assigned as the Gemini 10 commander and pilot, with Alan L. Bean and Clifton C. Williams Jr. as the backup crew. The primary mission of Gemini 10 was to dock with an Agena target vehicle (ATV) and use its engines to maneuver. Using the Agena engines to maneuver had been a failed objective of Gemini 8 and Gemini 9. The mission planned for Gemini 10 to dock with its assigned Agena target vehicle and then maneuver to rendezvous with the already orbiting Agena that had been previously assigned to Gemini 8. In the event of a failure of Gemini 10's target vehicle, the mission would still launch and attempt a rendezvous with Gemini 8's target vehicle.

The Agena target vehicle was launched on July 18, 1966, at 3:39 p.m. and successfully entered orbit. Gemini 10 launched as scheduled later that day at 5:20 p.m. from LC-19, within the 35-second launch window that maximized its chances of making the dual rendezvous. Once in orbit, the crew attempted to navigate to their first rendezvous using celestial navigation, but were unable to navigate and required inputs from Mission Control. Young maneuvered to a 265 × 272 km (165 × 169 mi) orbit to prepare for the rendezvous, and he had to make two midcourse corrections due to misalignment during the maneuver burns. Gemini 10 successfully rendezvoused and docked with the Agena target vehicle at 11:12 p.m. The higher-than-expected fuel consumption during the midcourse corrections caused flight director Glynn Lunney to cancel planned additional docking practice once the capsule had completed its rendezvous. Using the Agena's engines, Gemini 10 maneuvered to a 294 × 763 km (183 × 474 mi) elliptical orbit, which set a new altitude record for a crewed vehicle at the apogee. Gemini 10 used the rockets on the Agena to maneuver and rendezvous with the Gemini 8 Agena and set another new altitude record of 764 km (475 mi). Young fired the Agena engines to lower the apogee to 382 km (237 mi), and later circularized the orbit with another burn to raise the perigee to 377.6 kilometres (234.6 mi), which was 17 km (11 mi) below the Gemini 8 Agena. Collins performed a standup extravehicular activity (EVA) where he stood at the door of the Gemini capsule to photograph the southern Milky Way to study its ultraviolet radiation. He began a color photography experiment but did not finish it as his and Young's eyes began filling with tears due to irritation from the anti-fog compound in their helmets.

Gemini 10 undocked from its Agena and performed two maneuvers to rendezvous with the Gemini 8 Agena. Gemini 10 successfully rendezvoused with its second target vehicle 47 hours into the mission, and Young accomplished station keeping to keep the capsule approximately 3 m (9.8 ft) from the Agena vehicle. Collins conducted an EVA to retrieve a micrometeorite experiment package. After he handed the package to Young, Collins extended his umbilical to test his maneuverability using a nitrogen gun, but struggled with it and pulled himself back to the capsule with his umbilical cable. The crew maneuvered away from the Agena and lowered their perigee to 106 km (66 mi). Young conducted the retrofire burn and manually flew the reentry. The capsule landed 5.4 km (3.4 mi) from their recovery ship, USS Guadalcanal, in the western Atlantic Ocean on July 21, 1966, at 4:07 p.m. After the crew was recovered and aboard the ship, flight controllers completed several burns on the Agena target vehicle to put it in a 352 km (219 mi) circular orbit to be used as a target for future missions.

=== Apollo program ===
==== Apollo 10 ====
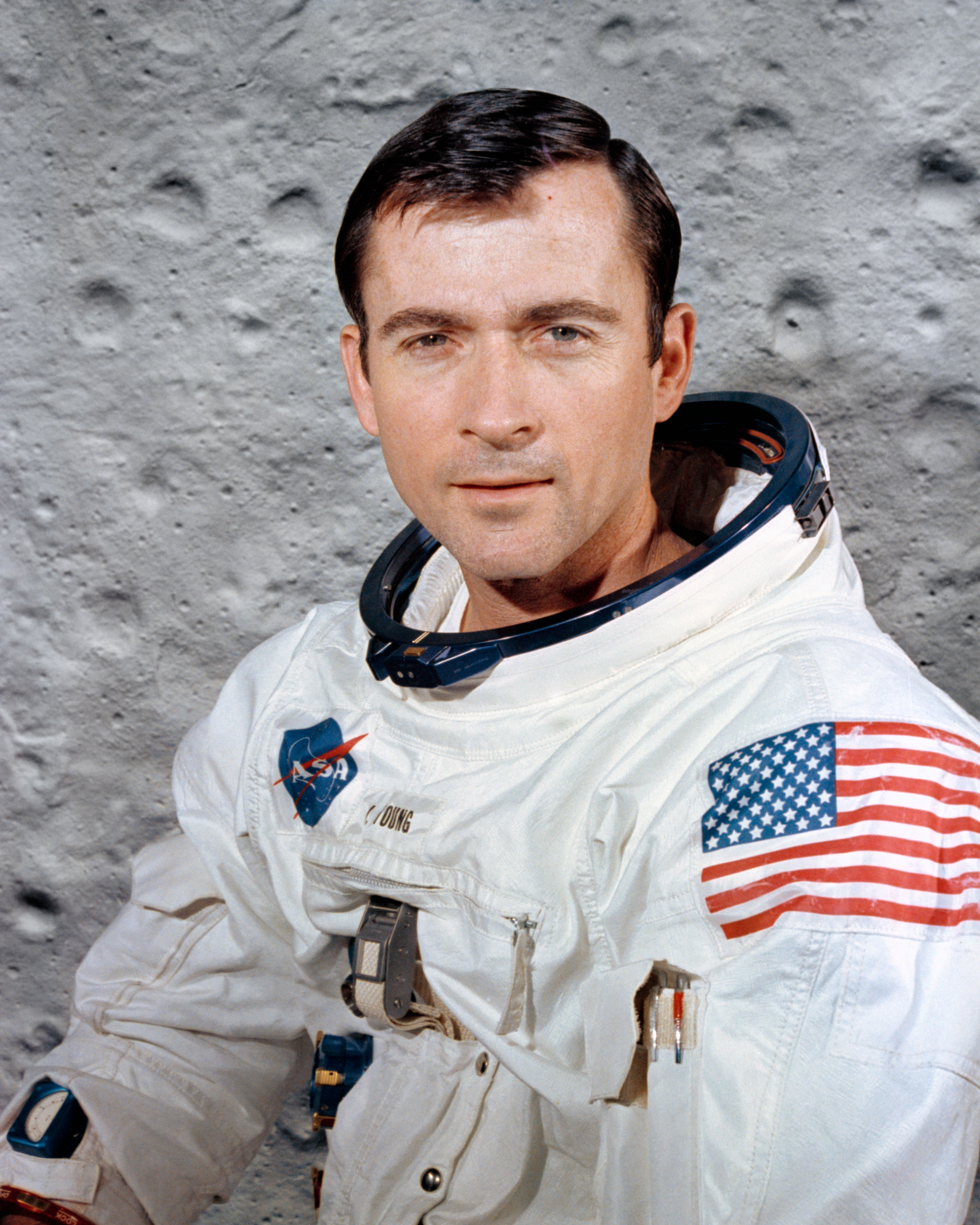
Young as the Apollo 10 command module pilot

Young was originally assigned as backup to the second crewed Apollo mission, along with Thomas P. Stafford and Eugene A. Cernan. After the delays caused by the fatal Apollo 1 fire in January 1967, Young, Cernan, and Stafford were assigned as the Apollo 7 backup crew. On November 13, 1968, NASA announced that the Apollo 10 crew would be commanded by Stafford, with Young as command module pilot and Cernan as the lunar module pilot. The backup crew was L. Gordon Cooper Jr., Donn F. Eisele, and Edgar D. Mitchell. Apollo 10 would be the only F-type mission, which entailed crewed entry into lunar orbit and testing of the lunar module, but without a landing. It would serve as a final test for the procedures and hardware before the first lunar landing. During flight preparation, the crew spent over 300 hours in simulators, both at the Manned Spacecraft Center and at Cape Kennedy. Mission Control linked with Young in the command module simulator and Stafford and Cernan in the lunar module simulator to provide realistic training. The crew selected the call sign Charlie Brown for the command module and Snoopy for the lunar module, in reference to the Peanuts comic strip by Charles M. Schulz.

On May 18, 1969, Apollo 10 launched at 11:49 a.m. After the trans-lunar injection (TLI) burn, Young successfully docked the command module with the lunar module. Young took celestial navigation measurements while en route to the Moon as a contingency for a loss of communication. Apollo 10 completed one midcourse correction, and Young performed the retrograde maneuver to bring the spacecraft into orbit 110 km (68 mi) above the lunar surface. On May 22, Stafford and Cernan entered the lunar module but were concerned that the docking ports' alignment had slipped by 3.5°. Apollo Program Spacecraft manager George M. Low determined that it was within acceptable limits, and the two spacecraft undocked. Young examined the lunar module after the two spacecraft were separated by 9 m (30 ft) and then maneuvered the command module 3.5 km (2.2 mi) away. Stafford and Cernan began their descent and flew the lunar module down to 14.447 km (8.977 mi) above the lunar surface. The lunar module crew tested the abort guidance system but had accidentally changed its setting from "attitude hold" to "automatic". As they prepared for the ascent, the lunar module began maneuvering as its automatic setting caused it to search for the command module. Stafford regained control of the spacecraft and flew the ascent towards the meeting with the command module. Young flew alone in the command module (thus becoming the first person to orbit the moon alone) and prepared to maneuver to the lunar module in the event that its ascent engine did not work. Once the lunar module rendezvoused with the command module, Young successfully docked the two spacecraft. The crew transferred to the command module and undocked from the lunar module, which was flown by Mission Control into a solar orbit. While still in lunar orbit, Young tracked landmarks in preparation for a lunar landing, then flew the trans-Earth injection (TEI) maneuver. On May 26, Apollo 10 reentered the Earth's atmosphere and safely landed 690 km (430 mi) from Samoa. It landed 6 km (3.7 mi) from its recovery ship, USS Princeton, and the crew was recovered by helicopter.

==== Apollo 16 ====
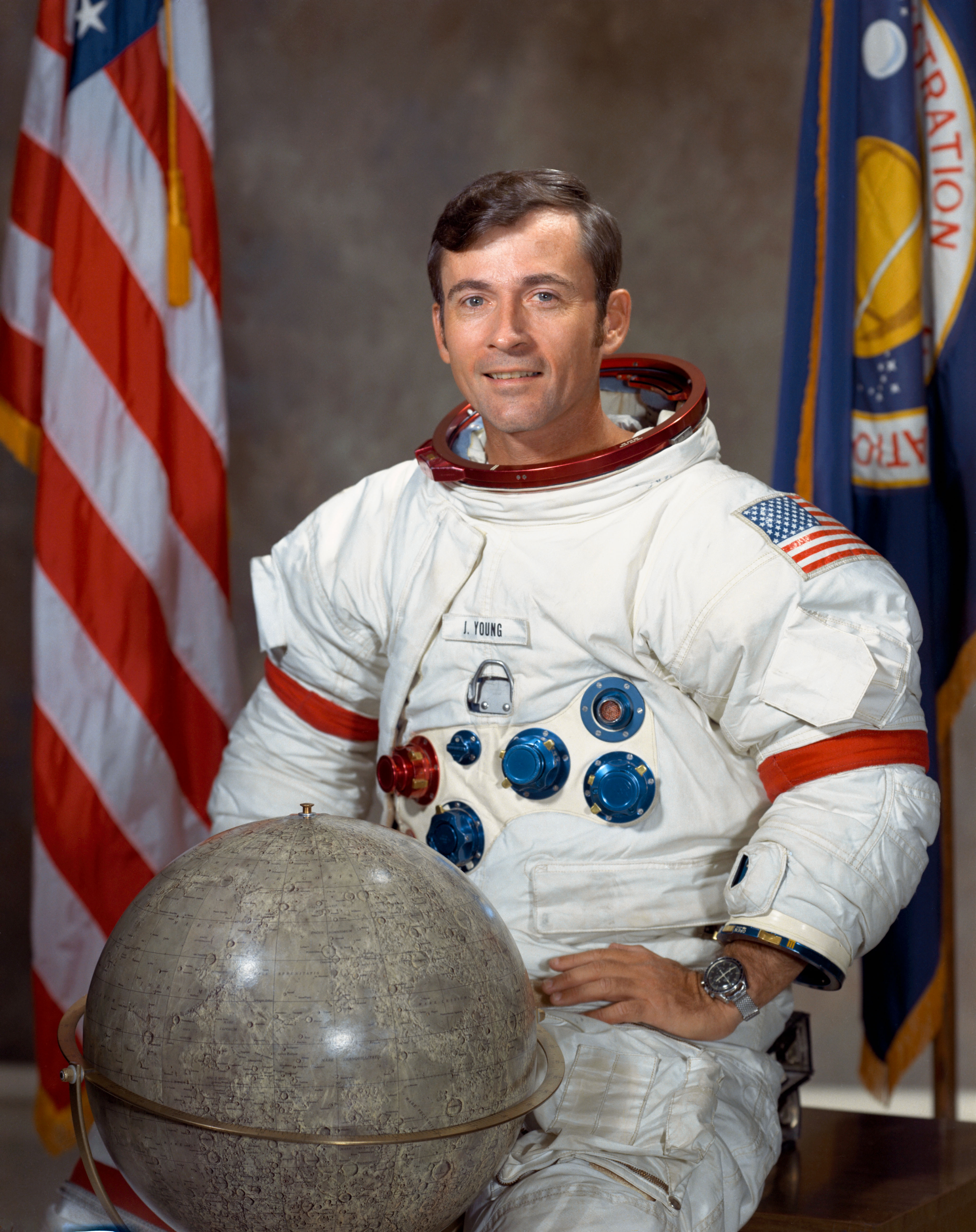
Young as the Apollo 16 commander

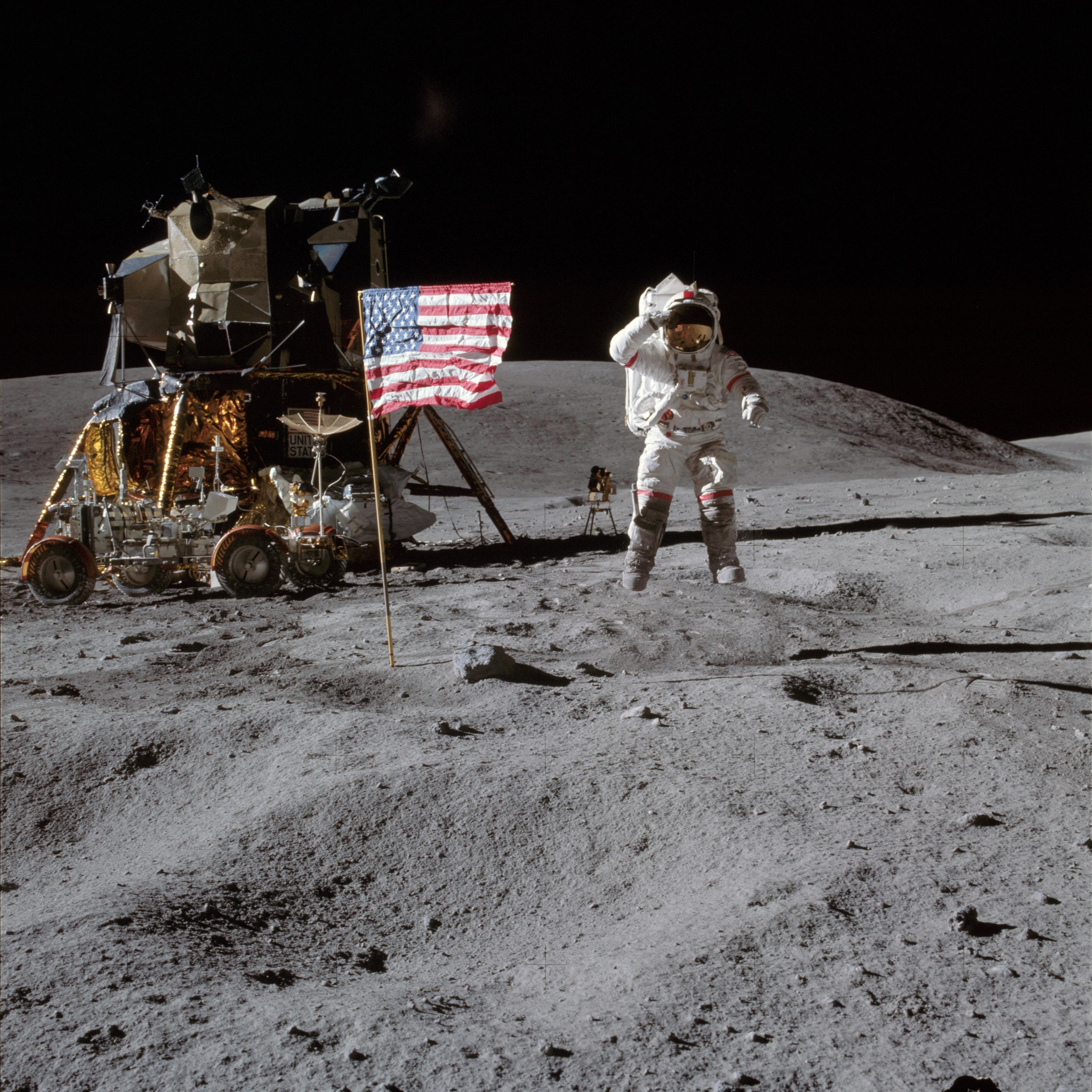
Young jumps while saluting the American flag during Apollo 16.

Young test driving the lunar rover on EVA 1

Young was assigned as backup commander of Apollo 13, along with Charles Duke and Jack Swigert. Duke exposed both the primary and backup crews to the German measles, causing the replacement of Ken Mattingly, who was not immune to German measles, by Swigert as the command module pilot two days prior to the launch.

On March 3, 1971, Young was assigned as the commander of Apollo 16, along with Duke and Mattingly. Their backup crew was Fred Haise, Stuart Roosa, and Edgar D. Mitchell. The mission's science objective was to study material from the lunar highlands, as they were believed to contain volcanic material older than the lunar mare that had been the sites of the previous Apollo landings. The Apollo Site Selection Board considered landing sites at Alphonsus crater and the Descartes Highlands, and it chose the Descartes Highlands as the Apollo 16 landing site on June 3. The mission science kit contained instruments to sample and photograph the lunar surface, as well as a magnetometer and a seismometer. Additionally, the crew brought an ultraviolet camera and spectrograph to study interplanetary and intergalactic hydrogen. To prepare for their EVAs, Young and Duke participated in field exercises in geological research. They conducted field work at the Mono craters in California to learn how to identify lava domes and tuff and the Sudbury Basin to study breccia.

Apollo 16 successfully launched at 12:54 p.m. on April 16, 1972. After the spacecraft reached Earth orbit, several problems developed with the S-IVB attitude control system, but Apollo 16 was still able to perform its trans-lunar injection burn. Mattingly docked the command module with the lunar module, and the crew decided to perform an early checkout of the lunar module over concerns that it had been damaged but found no issues. Apollo 16 flew behind the Moon 74 hours into the mission and entered into a 20 × 108 km (12 × 67 mi) elliptical orbit. The next day, Duke and Young entered the lunar module and undocked, but Mattingly soon reported an issue with the thrust vector controls on the service propulsion system, which would have prevented the command module from maneuvering in case the lunar module was unable to complete its rendezvous. After a delay, Mission Control approved the landing, and Young and Duke began their descent 5 hours and 42 minutes later than scheduled. As the lunar module descended, its projected landing location was 600 m (2,000 ft) north and 400 m (1,300 ft) west of its target location. Young took corrective action to adjust their landing location, and the lunar module landed 270 m (890 ft) north and 60 m (200 ft) west of its target location.

On April 21 Young and Duke began their first EVA. Young was the first to exit the lunar module, and his first words on the lunar surface were "I'm glad they got ol' Brer Rabbit here, back in the briar patch where he belongs". The two astronauts set up the lunar rover, and deployed the Apollo Lunar Surface Experiments Package (ALSEP). Mission Control informed Young that the U.S. House of Representatives had passed that year's space budget, which included funding to begin the Space Shuttle program. Young tripped over the cables to the heat flow sensors, which irreparably broke the sensors' communication link with Earth. The two astronauts conducted a seismic experiment using pneumatic hammers and began a traverse to Flag crater, which was 1.4 km (0.87 mi) west of the landing site. They set up a geology station at the crater, and collected Big Muley, a 11.7 kg (26 lb) breccia that was the largest lunar rock collected during the Apollo program. Young and Duke traveled back towards the lunar module, stopping at Spook and Buster craters along the way. Before ending the EVA, they tested the maneuverability of the lunar rover. They finished the EVA after seven hours on the lunar surface.

Young and Duke conducted their second EVA on April 22. They traveled to Cinco crater to sample at three geology sites, with the goal of finding ejecta from the South Ray crater. After they traveled to collect samples at the nearby Wreck crater, the rover's navigation system failed, forcing the two astronauts to manually navigate back to the lunar module. On their return trip, they stopped at the Apollo Lunar Surface Experiments Package to take soil samples. They returned to the lunar module and finished their EVA after seven hours on the lunar surface. The third EVA began on the morning of April 23. The two astronauts drove to North Ray crater and collected rock samples from its rim. They collected further samples from outside the crater to allow scientists to recreate the crater's stratigraphy using its ejecta. They returned to the lunar module and parked the rover to allow its cameras to broadcast their ascent. They ended their EVA after five hours; it was shorter than the previous two because of the delayed landing on the lunar surface.

On April 24, the lunar module successfully ascended into lunar orbit and docked with the command module. The astronauts transferred the 94 kg (207 lb) of lunar samples that they collected and jettisoned the lunar module. The command module completed its trans-Earth injection burn and began its flight back to Earth, during which time Mattingly performed an EVA to recover film from the exterior cameras and conduct an experiment on microbe exposure to ultraviolet sunlight. The command module (CM) reentered the atmosphere on April 27 and landed in the ocean approximately 350 km (220 mi) southeast of Christmas Island, and the crew was recovered aboard USS Ticonderoga. After the mission, Young was assigned as the Apollo 17 backup commander, along with Duke as the backup lunar module pilot and Stuart A. Roosa as the backup command module pilot. The backup crew was originally the Apollo 15 crew, but were removed after NASA management learned of their plan to sell the unauthorized postal covers they took to the lunar surface.

=== Space Shuttle program ===
In January 1973, Young was made Chief of the Space Shuttle Branch of the Astronaut Office. At the time, the overall Space Shuttle specifications and manufacturers had been determined, and Young's role was to serve as a liaison for the astronauts to provide design input. Young's office recommended changes for the orbiter's RCS thrusters, star tracker, and thermal radiators. In January 1974, he became Chief of the Astronaut Office after the departure of Alan B. Shepard Jr. One of his first roles after taking over the office was overseeing the end of the Skylab program and the Apollo-Soyuz Test Project (ASTP) mission, but the remainder of the spaceflights during his tenure were Space Shuttle missions. Young flew in the T-38 Talon chase planes for several of the Approach and Landing Tests (ALT) of the Space Shuttle Enterprise.

==== STS-1 ====
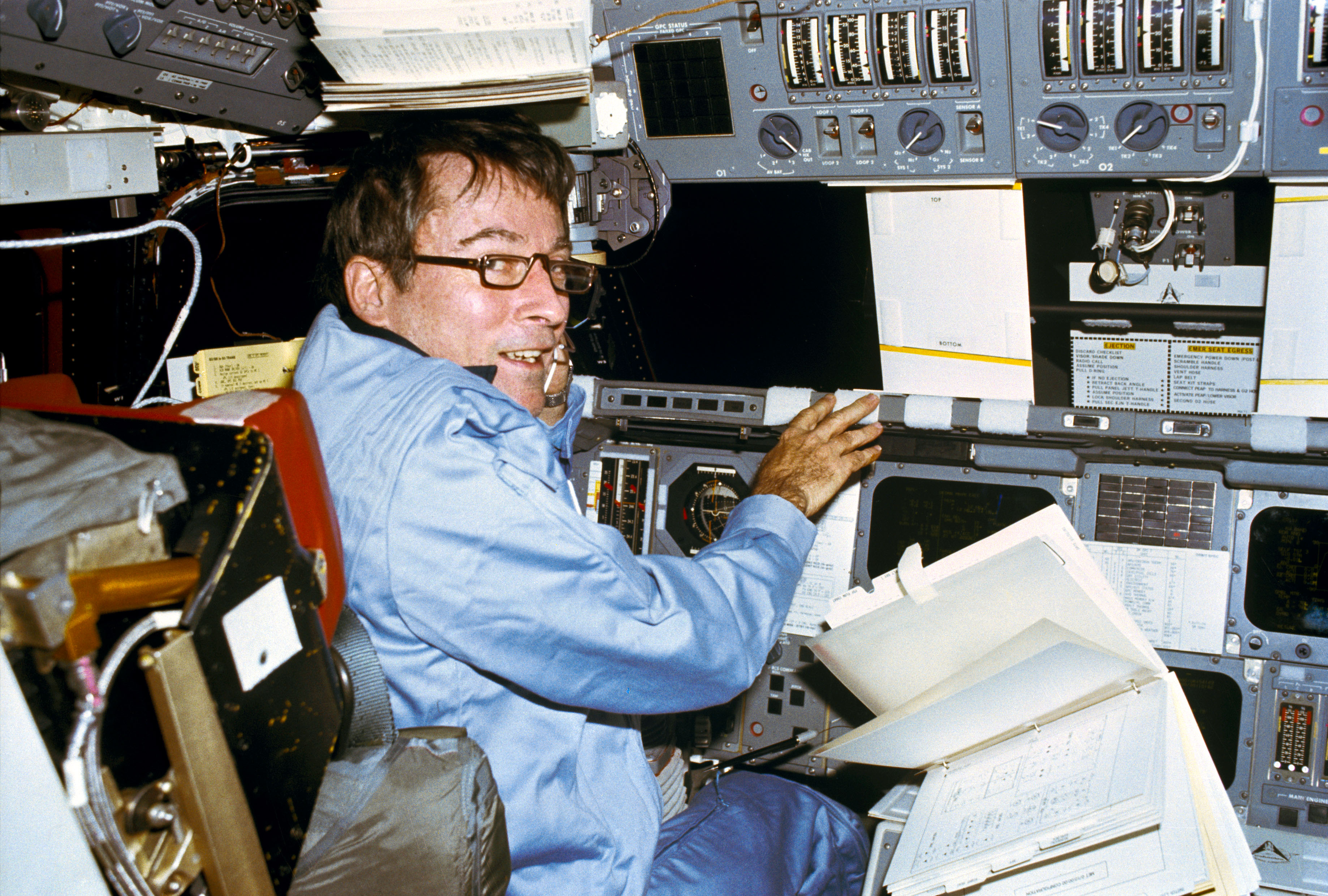
Young as the commander of STS-1

In March 1978, Young was selected by George W. S. Abbey, then deputy director of the Johnson Space Center (JSC), to be the commander of STS-1, with Robert L. Crippen flying as the pilot. Their backup crew, Joe H. Engle and Richard H. Truly, was the primary crew for STS-2. The development of Columbia was delayed because of the longer-than-predicted installation time of the Space Shuttle thermal protection system. Young and Crippen trained to be able to repair thermal tiles in-orbit, but determined that they would be unable to repair the tiles during a spacewalk.

The first launch attempt for STS-1 to launch was on April 10, 1981, but the launch was postponed at T–18 minutes due to a computer error. STS-1 launched at 7:00 a.m. on April 12 from LC-39A at the Kennedy Space Center. The first stage of the launch flew higher than anticipated, and the solid rocket boosters separated approximately 3,000 m (9,800 ft) higher than the original plan. The rest of the launch went as expected, and STS-1 successfully entered Earth orbit. Vice President George H. W. Bush called the crew during their first full day in orbit to congratulate them on their successful mission. The crew inspected their thermal tiles and determined that some had been lost during launch. Amid concerns that the underside of Columbia might have also lost some thermal shielding, a KH-11 KENNEN satellite was used to image the orbiter and it was determined that the orbiter could safely reenter the atmosphere. Young and Crippen tested the orbital maneuvering capabilities of the orbiter, as well as its mechanical and computer systems. STS-1 reentered the atmosphere and landed on April 14 at Edwards Air Force Base, California.

==== STS-9 ====
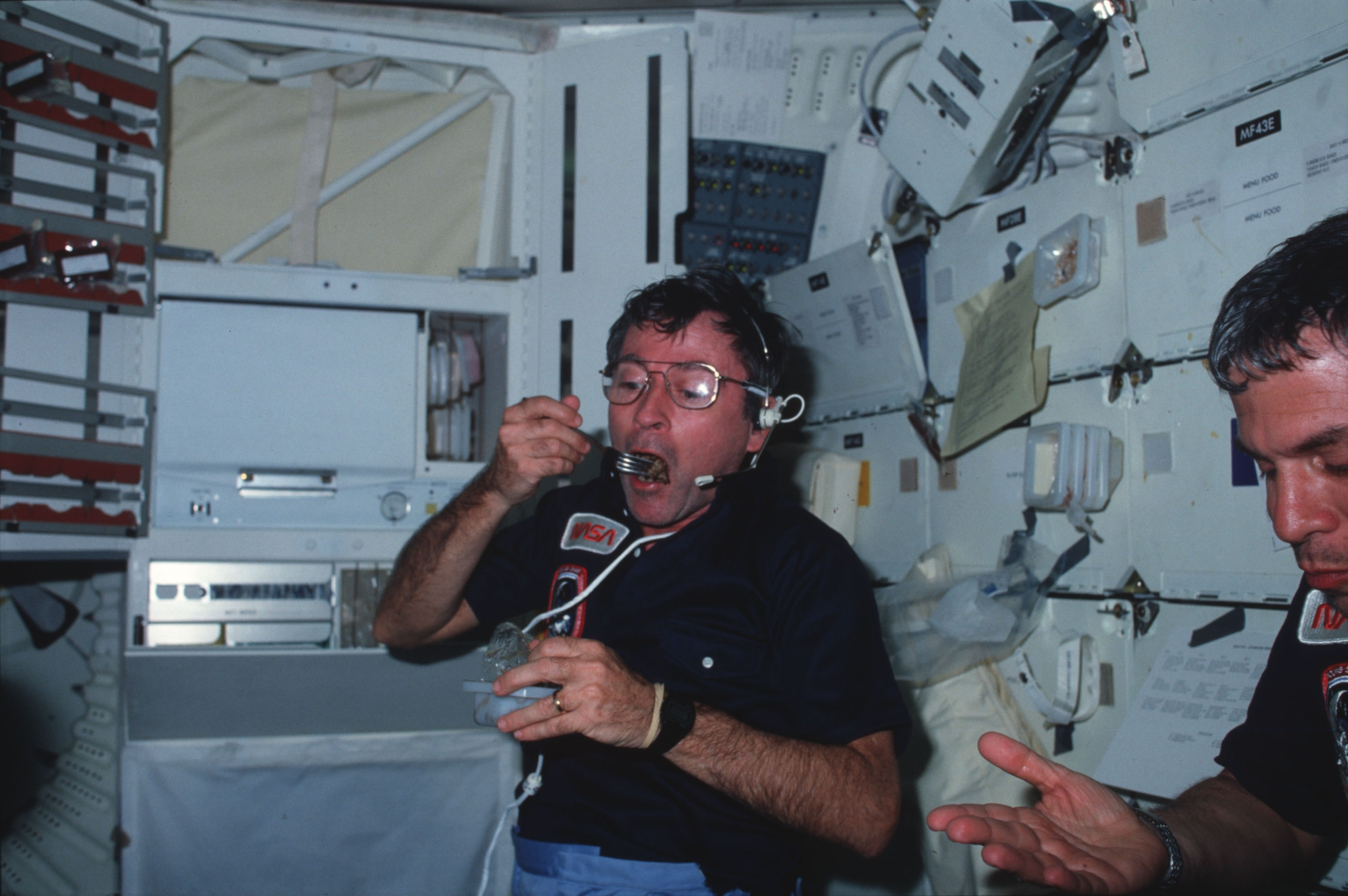
Young (left) and Robert Parker (right) eating on the Columbia middeck during STS-9

As the chief of the Astronaut Office, Young recommended the crews that flew on the subsequent test and operational Space Shuttle missions. Young would routinely sit in the simulators alongside the crews to determine their effectiveness, and he flew the Shuttle Training Aircraft (STA) to test landing approaches prior to the orbiter landing.

In 1983, Young flew as the commander of STS-9 aboard Space Shuttle Columbia. His pilot was Brewster H. Shaw, his two mission specialists were Owen K. Garriott and Robert A. Parker, and his two payload specialists were Byron K. Lichtenberg and West German astronaut Ulf Merbold. The mission was initially scheduled to launch on October 29, but was delayed by a problem with the right solid rocket booster. The flight launched from LC-39A at 11:00 a.m. on November 28. It carried the first Spacelab module into orbit, and the crew had to conduct a shift-based schedule to maximize on-orbit research in astronomy, atmospheric and space physics, and life sciences. Young tested a new portable onboard computer, and attempted to photograph Soviet airfields as Columbia orbited overhead. Prior to reentry, two of Columbia's four primary General Purpose Computers (GPC) failed, which caused a delay in landing as they had to reset them and load the Entry Options Control Mode into an alternate GPC. After the GPC was repaired, Columbia successfully reentered the atmosphere and landed at Edwards Air Force Base on December 8.

=== NASA management ===
Young remained as the chief of the Astronaut Office after STS-9. He was critical of NASA management following the Space Shuttle Challenger disaster and blamed the disaster on the lack of safety culture within the Space Shuttle program. Young testified before the Rogers Commission, and suggested improvements for the safety program at NASA. Young had been scheduled to fly as the commander of STS-61-J to deploy the Hubble Space Telescope, but the mission was canceled as a result of the Challenger disaster.

In May 1987, Young was replaced as the chief of the Astronaut Office by Daniel C. Brandenstein and was reassigned as Special Assistant to Johnson Space Center Director Aaron Cohen for Engineering, Operations and Safety. Young believed that his reassignment was the result of his public criticism of NASA management. He oversaw the redesign of the solid rocket boosters to prevent a repeat of the Challenger disaster and advocated for the strengthening of the thermal protection tiles at the chin-section of the orbiters. He continued to work on safety improvements in the Space Shuttle program, including improving the landing surfaces, installation of emergency drag parachutes, the inclusion of the Global Positioning System (GPS) into the Space Shuttle's navigation system, and improving landing simulations. In February 1996, he was assigned as the Associate Director (Technical) of Johnson Space Center, where he was involved in the development of the Shuttle–Mir program and the design process for the International Space Station (ISS).

After working at NASA for over 42 years Young retired on December 31, 2004. During his career, he flew for more than 15,275 hours, including more than 9,200 hours in T-38s and 835 hours in spacecraft during six space flights. Additionally, he spent over 15,000 hours in training to prepare for eleven primary and backup crew positions.

=== Retirement ===
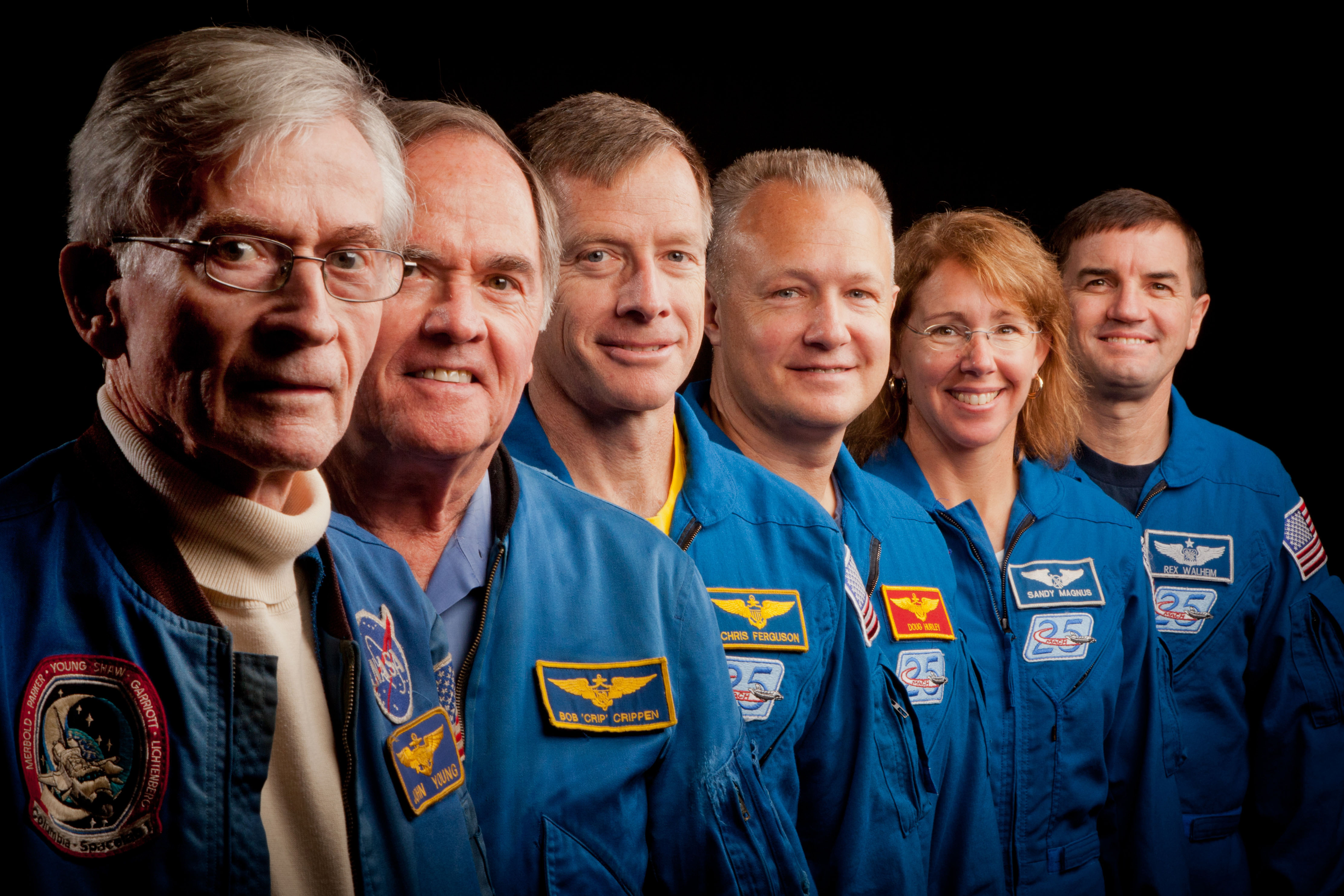
The crews of STS-1 and STS-135 in 2011

Following his retirement, Young worked as a public speaker, and advocated for the importance of asteroid impact avoidance, colonization of the Moon, and climate engineering. In April 2006, Young and Crippen appeared at the 25th anniversary of the STS-1 launch at the Kennedy Space Center and spoke of their experiences during the flight. In November 2011, Young and Crippen met with the crew of STS-135, the last Space Shuttle mission.

In 2012, Young and James R. Hansen co-authored his autobiography, Forever Young.

== Personal life ==
On December 1, 1955, Young married Barbara White of Savannah, Georgia, at St. Mark's Episcopal Church in Palatka, Florida. Together they had two children, Sandra and John, and two grandchildren. They were divorced in the summer of 1971. Later that year, he married Susy Feldman, and they lived in Houston. Young was friends with George H. W. Bush and Barbara Bush, and he vacationed at the Bush compound in Kennebunkport, Maine.

Young died on January 5, 2018, at his home in Houston, of complications from pneumonia, at the age of 87. He was interred at Arlington National Cemetery on April 30, 2019. He was remembered by NASA as the man who "walked on the Moon during Apollo 16 and commanded the first space shuttle mission."

== Awards and honors ==
While he served in the Navy, Young was awarded the Navy Astronaut Wings, Navy Distinguished Service Medal with a 5/16 inch star, and the Distinguished Flying Cross with two stars. During both his military and civilian career with NASA, he received the NASA Distinguished Service Medal (1969) with three oak leaf clusters, the NASA Exceptional Service Medal, the Congressional Space Medal of Honor, the NASA Space Flight Medal, the NASA Exceptional Engineering Achievement Medal, the NASA Outstanding Leadership Medal, and the NASA Exceptional Achievement Medal.

In 1981, NASA and the developers of the Space Shuttle won the Collier Trophy, and the crews of STS-1 and STS-2 received special recognition. Young was inducted into the International Space Hall of Fame in 1982, along with nine other Gemini astronauts. In 1988 Young was inducted into the National Aviation Hall of Fame. Young, along with the other Gemini astronauts, was inducted into the second U.S. Astronaut Hall of Fame class in 1993. In 1995, he was inducted into the International Air & Space Hall of Fame at the San Diego Air & Space Museum. In 2001, Young was inducted into the Georgia Aviation Hall of Fame.

Young was awarded the Golden Plate Award of the American Academy of Achievement in 1993. In 2010, he was awarded the General James E. Hill Lifetime Space Achievement Award He received the Exceptional Engineering Achievement Award in 1985, and the American Astronautical Society Space Flight Award in 1993. In 1998, he received the Philip J. Klass Award for Lifetime Achievement. He was a fellow of the American Institute of Aeronautics and Astronautics (AIAA), the American Astronautical Society (AAS), and the Society of Experimental Test Pilots (SETP).

Florida State Road 423, a highway in Orlando and Kissimmee, Florida, is named John Young Parkway. John Young Elementary School, a school in the Orange County Public Schools, was named after him. The planetarium at the Orlando Science Center was named in his honor.

Northrop Grumman announced in 2018 that the Cygnus spacecraft for Cygnus NG-10, their tenth cargo resupply mission to the International Space Station, would be named S.S. John Young. Cygnus NG-10 successfully launched on November 17, 2018, and concluded its mission on February 25, 2019.

Asteroid 5362 Johnyoung was named after Young.

== See also ==
- List of spaceflight records

Preceded by Alan B. Shepard	Chief of the Astronaut Office; 1974–1987	Succeeded by Daniel C. Brandenstein
