= Malachi Martin (politician) =

American politician

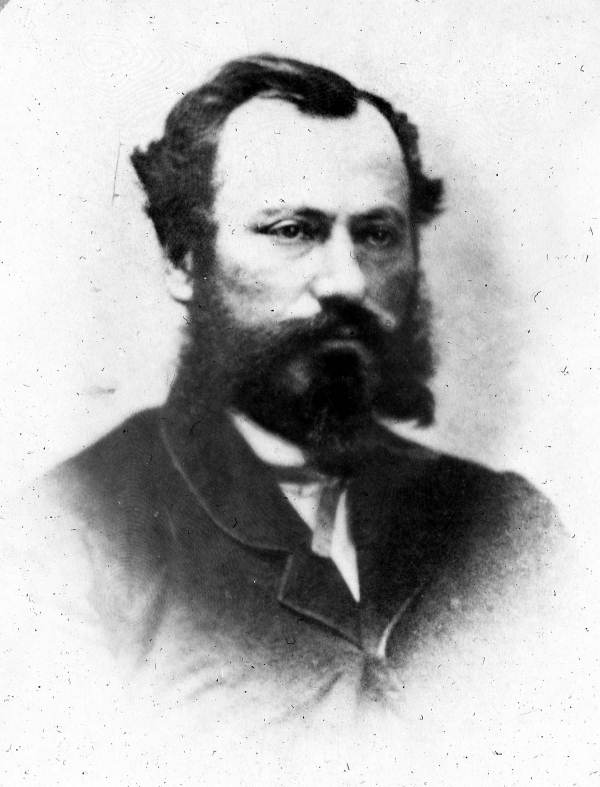

Speaker of the Florida House of Representatives
- In office 1874
- Preceded by: Simon B. Conover
- Succeeded by: Thomas Hannah

Member of the Florida House of Representatives
- In office 1872–1874

Personal details
- Born: c. 1822 Ireland
- Party: Republican

Military service
- Allegiance: United States of America
- Branch/service: Union Army
- Years of service: 1861–1866
- Rank: Captain
- Battles/wars: American Civil War

Malachi Martin (born c. 1822) was the prison warden at Florida's first state penitentiary in Chattahoochee, Florida and a state legislator. He was renowned for barbarity and corruption including the use of prison labor for his personal benefit. Another account blames changing politics for the most horrific accounts. He served as speaker of the Florida House of Representatives. Martin, a Republican, was friends with Samuel Fleischman who consulted with him before being murdered by the Ku Klux Klan.

Malachi was put in charge of Florida's first state prison in 1871. He used prisoners to build houses for his profit and to tend his vineyards. The book The American Siberia; or, Fourteen years' experience in a southern convict camp (1891) by J. C. Powell described the abuse he carried out. After the prisoners were relocated in 1876 to a prison at Raiford, Florida, the prison was renovated for use as Florida State Hospital, where mental patients were incarcerated.
