= Zuby =

British rapper and podcaster (born 1986)

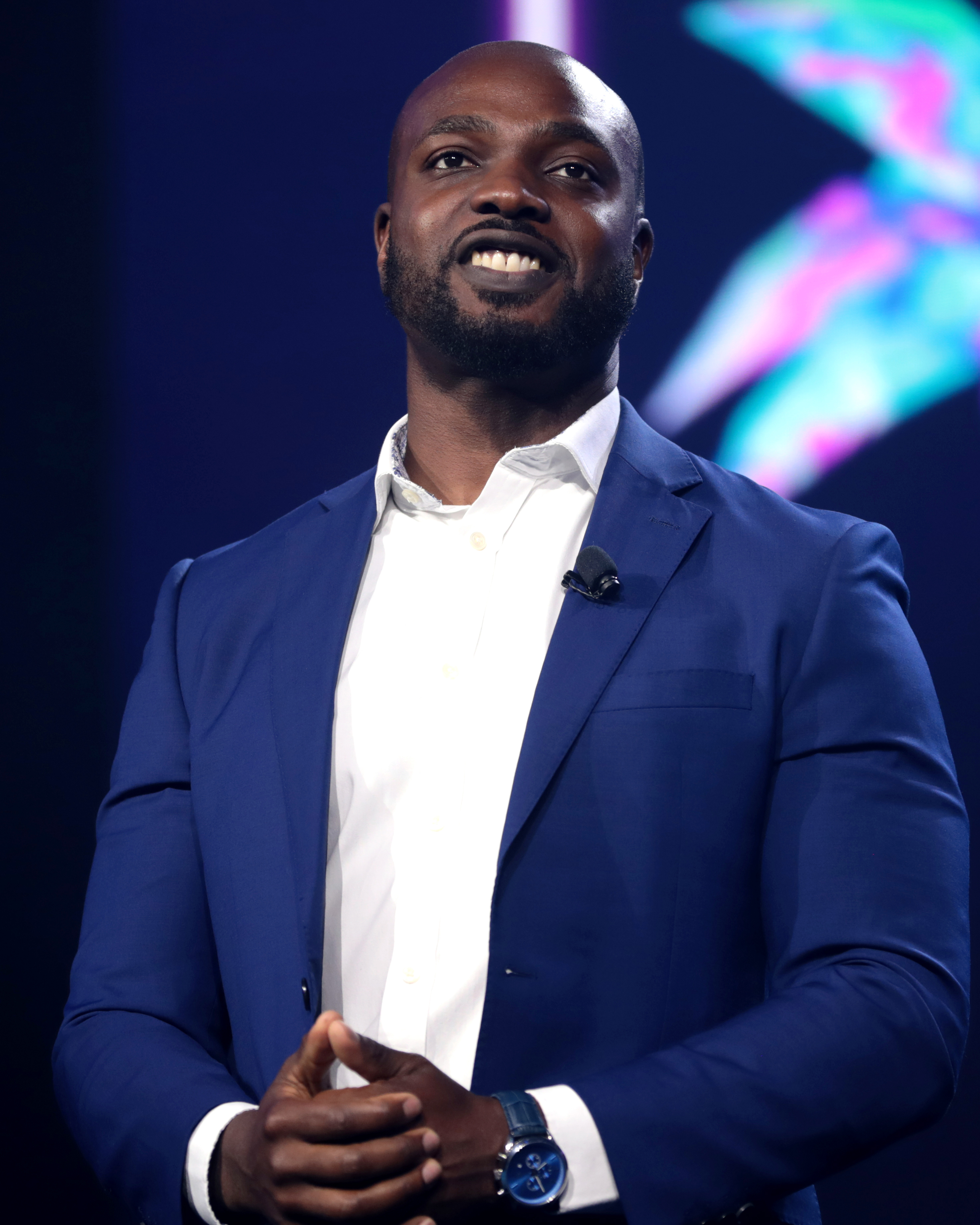
- Zuby at 2022 Revolution hosted by Young Americans for Liberty
- Born: Nzube Olisaebuka Udezue; 19 August 1986 (age 40); Luton, Bedfordshire, England
- Education: St Edmund Hall, Oxford
- Occupation: Rapper
- Website: zubymusic.com

Nzube Olisaebuka Udezue (born 19 August 1986), better known by his stage name Zuby, is a British rapper and podcaster. Born to Nigerian parents in Luton, Udezue was raised in Saudi Arabia and educated at St Edmund Hall, Oxford. He began rapping at university and has since self-released three albums. In July 2008, Udezue was misidentified and arrested by police at gunpoint at Bournemouth railway station. The incident received media coverage and the police apologized for the incident, which was compared to the shooting of Jean Charles de Menezes.

In March 2019, Udezue received media attention after posting a video on Twitter of himself performing a deadlift of 238 kg (525 lb), with a statement saying he had broken the British women's deadlift record while "identifying as a woman". Udezue stated that he published the video to criticize arguments that support allowing transgender women to compete in women's sports, which he believes are flawed.

== Early life and education ==
Nzube Olisaebuka Udezue was born to parents of Nigerian descent in Luton, Bedfordshire, England, on 19 August 1986. His father is a doctor and a fellow of the Royal Society of Tropical Medicine and Hygiene, and his mother a journalist. He has two brothers and two sisters. When Udezue was a year old, his parents moved to Saudi Arabia, where they worked for two decades, and he attended an international school. From the age of 11, Udezue attended a boarding school in the UK and frequently travelled between the two countries. Between 2004 and 2007, he studied at St Edmund Hall, Oxford, and graduated with a lower second-class honours (II.ii) degree in computer science. As a child, Udezue played trombone, which he played in a band, and piano. Later, during his teenage years, he became interested in hip-hop music.

== Career ==
In 2006, while at university, Udezue started rapping under the name Zuby and independently released his debut album Commercial Underground, which he says sold over 3,000 copies. He self-released his second album, entitled The Unknown Celebrity, in December 2007. After graduating, he moved to London, and in August 2008 he worked there as a management consultant for Accenture while continuing to make music. In October 2011, Udezue self-released his third album, Commercial Underground 2, and then pursued music full time. In February 2013, an extended play (EP) entitled Zubstep was self-released. By August 2016, Udezue claimed that he had sold over 20,000 albums. That year, he released the EP Seven. In 2019, Udezue started a podcast, Real Talk with Zuby. In 2022, he published a children's book that shows the benefits of self-control and good nutrition. Earlier in 2022, he spoke at a Mises Caucus event at the Libertarian Party convention in Reno, Nevada, where he "talk[ed] about freedom, liberty, and all of that good stuff." Udezue has appeared on The Joe Rogan Experience podcast.

== Police incident ==
It took me a couple of seconds to realise that it was me that all those guns were aimed at. I honestly felt like I'd stepped off the train and into a really bad dream. I'm shocked, confused, scared and embarrassed all at the same time. Most of the bystanders had vacated the platform by now, by police order. And I'm not talking about normal police either. This is the Specialist Firearms Unit, about eight of them, machine guns, bulletproof vests, police dogs and all. And they're here to arrest me!

— Nzube Udezue, describing his encounter with the police

On 5 July 2008, at 3:49 pm, a man displayed an imitation firearm at an indoor shopping centre in Basingstoke; afterwards, Hampshire Constabulary distributed a description of him. At 5:24 pm the same day, Udezue boarded a train from Southampton to Bournemouth, which is about 30 miles (48 km) from Basingstoke. Shortly thereafter, British Transport Police (BTP), after being notified by Hampshire Police, believed Udezue may have been involved in the Basingstoke incident. Throughout this time, miscommunication about the colour of Udezue's T-shirt occurred; the BTP initially described his shirt as "brown" but it was later described as "dark". About ten officers then blocked off the exits as the train approached Bournemouth railway station. The train arrived at 6:09 pm. Udezue was arrested at gunpoint, forced to lie prone, and handcuffed by Dorset Police. He was briefly detained at Bournemouth police station before being released. Dorset Police later issued an apology for the arrest. He was arrested because he was a black man wearing a black t-shirt, which matched the description of the actual suspect. Udezue quipped: "And to think I was going to wear a blue T-shirt this morning". Udezue, who had no criminal record, later described the incident as a "really bad dream" and said he had "never been so traumatised" in his life.

Rather than conducting a full investigation themselves, the Independent Police Complaints Commission (IPCC) asked Dorset Police's Professional Standards Department to investigate the three forces involved. In a statement, the IPCC said the actions of Dorset Police were "appropriate and proportionate to the circumstances". On 14 July, Udezue's solicitor filed an official complaint to the IPCC over the incident and requested a full and independent investigation into the incident.

A few days after the incident, Udezue's social media accounts received many supportive messages from the public. Udezue's local Member of Parliament, Tobias Ellwood of the Conservative Party, stated he backed the actions of the police, saying they do a "very difficult job", and that it is important "police don't fear stepping in for fear of reprisals if they get the wrong person". The arrest was compared to the shooting of Jean Charles de Menezes. Entertainment Weekly's Simon Vozick-Levinson described the incident as "something of a cause célèbre". The Guardian's Paul Lewis and Vozick-Levinson said the incident may be an example of racial profiling. Udezue, who is of Nigerian heritage, thought his race was not pivotal to the incident, but should still be considered a part of any investigation.

== Views ==
Udezue is a critic of identity politics. According to Reason, he is "known for an engaging mix of personal uplift and political provocation".

=== Race ===
Udezue has argued that the United States "is not a racist country." In 2019, he was interviewed by the CBC in response to Detroit's "AfroFuture Fest" music festival's ticket pricing scheme, in which whites were charged $20, and all other ethnicities $10 per ticket. Udezue criticised the event's organisers, commenting: "Well done intersectional radicals. You've become the very racists you claim to stand against."

=== Transgender people ===
ZUBY
(@ZubyMusic)
tweeted:

I keep hearing about how biological men don't have any physical strength advantage over women in 2019...

So watch me DESTROY the British Women's deadlift record without trying.

P.S. I identified as a woman whilst lifting the weight. Don't be a bigot. 😂

26 February 2019

In March 2019, Udezue received media attention after posting on Twitter a video of himself performing a deadlift of 238 kg (525 lb), and subsequently stating he had broken the British women's deadlift record while "identifying as a woman". Shortly thereafter, he made similar comments about the British women's bench press record. The tweets added to the ongoing debate about transgender people in sports. Udezue has said he does not think trans women should be allowed to compete in women's sport. Udezue went on to say he posted the tweets to demonstrate the "fallacies of the arguments on the other side" and commented: "I have seen people saying there is no inherent biological strength difference between men and women. I posted it being a bit tongue-in-cheek, showing what I think is the obvious absurdity of their argument." After he expressed these views, Rosamund Urwin of The Times described Udezue as an "unlikely feminist icon".

Outsports criticized an article about the tweet on WQAD-TV's website as "one-sided" and "transphobic"; in response, WQAD rewrote parts of its article, changing "informally breaks female dead-lift record" to "declares he broke female deadlift record" in the headline, describing the tweet as "trolling the debate of transgender people competing in athletic events", and adding a quote from Outsports' managing editor: "Just deciding on a whim that Zuby says he's identifying as a woman, that's not how it works".

In February 2020, after Udezue posted a tweet advising women on "how to land a great guy", transgender activist Emily Gorcenski, who is a trans woman, replied: "I'm like 95% sure I'm sleeping with more women than you and this is terrible advice". Udezue responded with "Ok dude...", which according to The Washington Examiner, resulted in his Twitter account being temporarily suspended for "hateful conduct". Udezue said that he deleted the tweet after his appeal was denied; his account was then restored.

In September 2020, Udezue, together with other notable figures, signed a letter in support of author J. K. Rowling's views on transgender people.

Despite being against transgender women participating in women's sports, Udezue says that he supports the rights of transgender people.

== Personal life ==
In 2008, Udezue lived in Bournemouth, Dorset, with his parents, and since 2019, he has lived in Southampton. He frequently spends time in the United States. Udezue is a Christian. He was also the cousin of the deceased Nigerian rapper Lotanna Udezue, better known as Biglo.

== Discography ==
=== Studio albums ===
- Commercial Underground (2006)
- The Unknown Celebrity (2007)
- Commercial Underground 2 (2011)

=== Extended plays ===
- Zubstep (2013)
- Seven (2016)

== Filmography ==
- The Tuttle Twins Season 1, Episode 6 – "The Inflation Monster" (Associate producer)
