= List of Atomwaffen Division members in the United States who faced criminal charges =

Members of the Atomwaffen Division, an international neo-Nazi terrorist network, have been alleged to have been responsible for a number of murders, planned terrorist attacks, as well as other criminal actions. This list contains some of those who have been criminally charged for activities done in connection with the Atomwaffen Division in the United States, including those who have been convicted.

== Brandon Russell ==
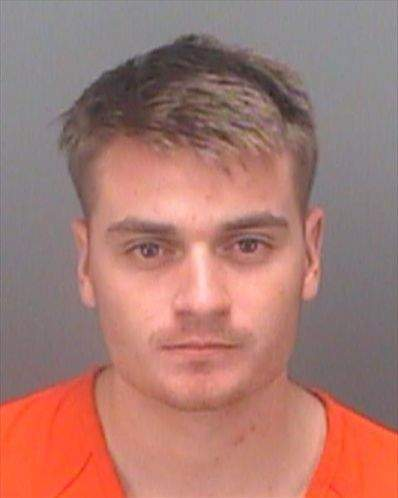
Brandon Clint Russell mugshot

In May 2017, on the night of Devon Arthurs' arrest, his third roommate, a 21-year-old, Brandon Russell was also arrested and questioned by local police and the FBI. While it was determined that Russell was not involved in the homicides and was released, the deaths drew investigators' attention to a large stash of explosives at the same location.

When the authorities searched Russell's garage, they found explosive precursors ammonium nitrate, nitromethane, homemade detonators and an explosive compound hexamethylene triperoxide diamine. HMTD has been used to make improvised explosive devices by groups such as al-Qaeda, and ammonium nitrate and nitromethane were used by Timothy McVeigh, the perpetrator of the Oklahoma City bombing. The authorities also found thorium and americium, two radioactive substances, in Russell's bedroom. Russell, a former student of nuclear physics at the University of South Florida and a Florida Army National Guardsman, had a framed photograph of Timothy McVeigh in his bedroom. The authorities also discovered guns, various Atomwaffen paraphernalia and neo-Nazi propaganda.

The FBI issued an arrest warrant for Russell on explosives charges and the FBI bulletin warned he might be planning a terrorist attack. Russell was arrested again with another member in Monroe County. The car they were driving contained assault rifles, body armor and more than 1000 rounds of ammunition which they had acquired after the shooting. Russell claimed the explosives were used to power model rockets, but according to an FBI bomb technician the explosives were powerful enough to destroy an airliner. The prosecutors alleged Russell "planned to use the explosives to harm civilians, nuclear facilities and synagogues."

In September 2017, Russell pleaded guilty to possessing an unregistered destructive device and illegally storing explosives in federal court; in January 2018, he was sentenced to five years in prison for those crimes. He was released from prison on August 23, 2021.

=== Baltimore arrests ===
In February 2023 Russell and a Maryland woman were charged with allegedly conspiring to attack electric substations in the Baltimore area. Russell and Sarah Clendaniel, have been arrested for planning to attack numerous Baltimore electrical substations, aiming to “completely destroy this whole city” in an apparently racially motivated attack. On February 4, 2025 Russell was found guilty of one count of conspiracy to damage an energy facility. On August 7, 2025, Judge James K. Bredar sentenced Russell to the maximum 20 years in prison and a lifetime of supervised release, rejecting arguments that he was less culpable than Clendaniel.

== Vasillios Pistolis ==
In August 2017, during the Unite the Right rally in Charlottesville, Virginia, Vasillios Pistolis, a corporal in the United States Marine Corps who was also a member of Atomwaffen Division, was recorded chanting "White Lives Matter" and "You Will Not Replace Us" with his fellow torch-bearing protestors on the first day of the rally. On the second day of the rally, he assaulted Emily Gorcenski, a transgender woman, with a modified version of the Confederate flag that incorporated the neo-Nazi Black Sun symbol in its center, and he even bragged about the beating in private chats under the alias of "VasillistheGreek": "So to sum it up what I did Friday, dropped kicked that tranny that made video crying", "Today cracked 3 skulls open with virtually no damage to myself", and "I drop kicked Emily Gorcenski". Pistolis was also part of a gang of neo-Nazis that assaulted an interracial couple at a restaurant in a suburb of Nashville, Tennessee. Pistolis had promoted the Unite the Right rally on Twitter and posted an image of a car running over a left-winger with the caption "Good Night, Left Side". He also mocked the death of Heather Heyer, calling her "a fat cunt who died of a heart attack. She wasn't even in the way of the car".

Although Pistolis denied that he participated in the rally or committed a violent act, he was later investigated by the United States Marine Corps and court-martialed, and in June 2018, he was imprisoned and reduced in rank for disobeying orders and making false statements. He was officially separated from the United States Marine Corps in July 2018.

=== Virginia arrest ===
Pistolis was charged in Albemarle County with "using fire to racially intimidate", a Virginia anti-KKK cross burning statute and was arrested on September 5, 2024.

== Riley Williams ==
22-year-old Capitol rioter Riley Williams, who was associated with the Atomwaffen Division and the Order of Nine Angles, stole a laptop computer from then-House Speaker Nancy Pelosi's office during the January 6 United States Capitol attack. (Note: Attributed to multiple sources.) According to Williams' boyfriend, who reported her to law enforcement, she intended to send the laptop to a contact in Russia for sale to Russian intelligence; however, the transfer never occurred. Williams was later convicted and sentenced to three years in prison.

== Jeffrey Clark ==
In November 2018, authorities in Washington arrested a 30-year-old man named Jeffrey Clark on weapons charges after the FBI received a tip from his family members that he and his brother Edward Clark, 23, might be planning a massacre. It was revealed that the brothers were connected to the Pittsburgh synagogue shooting suspect, Robert Bowers. In court, Federal prosecutors filings noted that the brothers may have known about the attack and that they openly admired McVeigh, Dylann Roof, Charles Manson and Unabomber Ted Kaczynski and wanted to kill Jews and other minorities. According to the family members the brothers wanted to hasten up the coming race war and revolution. Online, Jeffrey Clark described Bowers as a "hero" and called the massacre a "dry run for things to come". The authorities found guns, Atomwaffen propaganda, hollow-point bullets and ballistic vests and helmets in the apartment of the Clark brothers, and according to Propublica the brothers had communicated on the Atomwaffen chatroom for initiates and members.

Prosecutors urged the court to keep Clark in detention pending trial and take his threats seriously "in light of the defendant's access to weapons, possession of body armor, possession of high-capacity ammunition magazines, glorification of acts of violence, and proclamations that he was 'committed to the survival of the white race by any means necessary'". Later, the authorities managed to track down the younger brother, who was discovered dead of a gunshot wound on Theodore Roosevelt Island.

Jeffrey Clark pleaded guilty to the gun charges and was sentenced to time served since his arrest by the FBI, followed by three years of supervised release.

== Benjamin Bogard ==
20-year-old Benjamin Bogard was arrested by the Federal Bureau of Investigation in February 2019 after the FBI received a tip that Bogard might be planning a terrorist attack. According to an agent, Bogard talked about wanting to go cross-country to find and kill minorities, Mexicans, and women, anyone who Bogard felt was "shit". He said on one video, which he ended with a Nazi salute, "Pull out your shotgun, get to the side of the road, pump that shit open, point it at them, and pull the trigger." On Twitter, he described himself as a "future mass shooter" and said that his favorite part of a gun is "the part that kills 30 babies per trigger pull." Bogard embraced white supremacist beliefs and discussed obtaining a chemical substance to make a bomb. Bogard had also searched online for targets to bomb and planned to attack the state capitol. According to federal authorities, Bogard claims to be a member of the Atomwaffen Division. He was arrested on charges of possession of child pornography after the authorities uncovered videos of young girls being raped on his phone during the investigation. The FBI decided to arrest him because it appeared that Bogard was "mobilizing for violence."

FBI Special Agent Christopher Combs stated that the evidence "demonstrated the defendant's fixation with committing barbaric and inhumane acts of violence against children and others". Bogard was subsequently sentenced to 80 months in federal prison.

== Conor Climo ==
In August 2019 the FBI arrested 23-year-old security guard Conor Climo on suspicion of possessing parts to make a bomb. According to the FBI, Climo wanted to contribute "his knowledge of constructing explosive devices toward a 'righteous' cause". Climo was originally in contact with the Baltic branch Feuerkrieg before joining the main American organization in Las Vegas, Nevada, where he started planning the attack. Climo wanted to form a team of snipers who would bomb a Las Vegas synagogue and then shoot the surviving Jews. He also sketched a detailed plan to attack a gay bar from the inside and outside simultaneously, using two squads. Climo considered other targets, including police leadership and the headquarters for the Anti-Defamation League. An AR platform rifle, a bolt-action rifle and various bomb-making components, circuits and chemicals were found in Climo's bedroom, as well as schematics of Improvised explosive devices. According to an FBI special bomb technician the materials were consistent with the items needed to function a timed explosive device. Like many other Atomwaffen members, Climo had been in the US Army in 2014 and 2015 as a combat engineer, and was trained in the use, construction, and demolition of explosives. The main leader of the Las Vegas cell of Atomwaffen Division had suggested blowing up natural gas pipe lines with thermite, and several jars of the substance were found in Climo's apartment during the raid.

== Andrew Thomasberg ==
On September 19, 2019, Andrew Thomasberg was arrested at his home in McLean, Virginia, for selling guns illegally. FBI Special Agent Shawn Matthews, whose focus is on domestic terrorism, testified that after the Unite the Right rally, in which he participated with Vanguard America, Thomasberg joined the Atomwaffen Division, that, in Matthews' words, is "distinct in that it advocates for violence or violent acts to start a racial war in the United States." Law enforcement found 20 guns in the house Thomasberg lives in with his mother, stepfather and sister. Six of the weapons were in Thomasberg's room, and a pistol was in his car. Most of the weapons were loaded.

In group chat text messages, Thomasberg talked about a racially motivated shooting he committed and discussed in length about his use of LSD. He also displayed "significant knowledge of gun manufacture" and obtained equipment for that purpose. He said that the Poway synagogue shooting "Coulda been so good" and called Robert Gregory Bowers and Brenton Tarrant saints. He also told a friend – who is now a cooperating witness – that he was "carrying enough gear and supplies to set the new high score and wouldn't want to have to explain that to a cop"; Matthews testified that a "new high score" referred to the number of people killed in a mass shooting. It was also revealed that Thomasberg had given armed training to the man who shot and killed Bao Hung Van in Fairfax County, Virginia, in 2018. Judge Theresa Buchanan called the evidence "extremely concerning" and denied bail.

On November 12, 2019, Thomasberg pleaded guilty "to making a material false statement in relation to the purchase of a firearm and to possessing firearms while being an unlawful user of or addicted to controlled substances." He was sentenced to 12 months in prison on February 28, 2020. Thomasberg was released on July 27 2020.

== Jarrett Smith ==
On September 23, 2019, Specialist Jarrett William Smith, 24, of Fort Riley, Kansas, was charged with distributing information related to explosives and weapons of mass destruction. Smith had joined the U.S. Army on June 12, 2017, and as an infantry soldier, he was trained in combat and tactical operations. In March 2019, the FBI had received a tip that Smith was talking about building bombs. According to a federal criminal complaint Smith planned to build a bomb "powerful enough to damage or destroy US military vehicles and obliterate civilian vehicles and people nearby" to "cause chaos" and had considered Antifa, cell towers and local news station as potential targets. In the chat logs accessed by the FBI Smith gave his fellow neo-Nazis very specific instructions on how to build IEDs, cellphone explosive devices 'in the style of the Afghans', bombs out of household chemicals and devices and car bombs, which an FBI bomb technician confirmed were viable.

He also talked about his desire to "kill...every last Jew across the world" and go to Ukraine to fight with the Azov Battalion. He met with another man in the neo-Nazi network named Craig Lang who had already fought with the local neo-Nazi militias between 2015 and 2019. Lang, who currently lives in Ukraine, faces federal charges in the United States for the murder of Serafin Lorenzo and Deana Lorenzo during an armed robbery in Estero, Florida, selling weapons to fund his travels abroad, and passport fraud.

Smith was identified as a member of the Atomwaffen Division, and he had also been in contact with the Baltic branch Feuerkrieg Division. He used the pseudonym "Anti-Kosmik", a reference to "Anti-Cosmic" Satanism. Assistant US Attorney Anthony Mattivi alleged in federal court that bombing a news organization was just the first step in his plan to ultimately overthrow the federal government. He also claimed that Smith distributed explosives information and was planning on assassinating federal agents with three other people "for the glory of his Satanist religion". On February 10, 2020, Smith pleaded guilty to two counts of distributing information related to explosives, destructive devices and weapons of mass destruction and was sentenced to 30 months in federal prison.

== Aiden Bruce-Umbaugh ==
On November 4, 2019, Aiden Bruce-Umbaugh, 23, was riding in a car driven by Kaleb Cole, 24, when it was stopped by the police in Garza County, Texas. According to the complaint the deputies noticed a machete protruding from a compartment inside the car, and both Bruce-Umbaugh and Cole were wearing tactical attire. Inside of the vehicle authorities discovered several weapons, including a Sig Sauer 9mm, an AR-15 rifle, two AK-47 rifles, "between 1,500 and 2,000 rounds of ammunition" and marijuana. Bruce-Umbaugh said the guns and drugs belonged to him and he was arrested. Cole was allowed to leave the scene but later a warrant was issued for his arrest. A federal grand jury indicted Bruce-Umbaugh and he was charged with possession of a firearm by an unlawful user of a controlled substance. During the detention hearing the court also heard a recording of a phone call in which Bruce-Umbaugh told the deputies were lucky they caught him off guard or he would have "shot the pigs". He was denied bail. Bruce-Umbaugh pleaded guilty and was sentenced to 30 months in federal prison.

Neither Bruce-Umbaugh nor Cole is allowed to possess firearms. The FBI had sought an Extreme Risk Protection Order against Cole and seized his cache of weapons which included five assault rifles, a shotgun and pistols in October 2019. According to the FBI Cole had also acquired separate parts needed to manufacture untraceable AR-15s. Seattle City Attorney Pete Holmes told the media they "firmly believe, prevented a massacre". Cole had previously been detained for questioning in December 2018 upon landing in Chicago's O'Hare International Airport. Several Atomwaffen members, including Cole and Bruce-Umbaugh had travelled to Germany and Eastern European countries, among them Ukraine where Atomwaffen has contacts with the Azov Battalion. The records were used by the FBI to justify the ERPO request.

== "Operation Erste Säule" ("Operation First Pillar") ==
On February 26, 2020, the FBI Joint Terrorism Task Force arrested five senior members of Atomwaffen in a large operation spanning multiple states. It was claimed that they planned a coordinated operation, called "Operation Erste Säule" ("Operation First Pillar"), to terrorize members of the media. During the arrests knives, firearms and body armor were also confiscated. Arrested were John Cameron Denton of Montgomery, Texas, 26, Johnny Garza of Queen Creek, Arizona, 20, Cameron Shea of Redmond, Washington, 24, Taylor Parker-Dipeppe of Spring Hill, Florida, 20 and Kaleb Cole of Montgomery, Texas, 24. The group is charged in connection to a campaign of intimidation against journalists and activists who had tried to expose the group. The members would allegedly visit the apartments of their victims with their faces covered, deface their houses and intimidate them with death threats, including threatening to burn their houses down. Several of the victims moved or went into hiding out of fear for their lives. An investigative reporter, Chris Ingalls with KING-TV in Seattle, moved his family out of their home and said "I'll be looking over my shoulder for a long time". Another victim, Mala Blomquist, an editor for Arizona Jewish Life said she was traumatized by the ordeal and no longer leaves the house alone.

In addition to these charges, Kaleb Cole had an arrest warrant for violating his Extreme Risk Protection Order when he was caught in a car containing assault rifles and a large amount of ammunition with Aiden Bruce-Umbaugh in November 2019. Denton had also called in a large amount of swatting calls and bomb and death threats against journalists, politicians, predominantly African-American churches and even a member of the cabinet. According to the court documents the calls by Denton impacted 134 different law enforcement agencies. Federal prosecutors also allege Denton possessed child pornography of an underage girl who was sexually involved with the members of the group. Denton pled guilty to conspiring to transmit threats and Shea plead guilty to federal conspiracy and hate crime charge. Cole was sentenced to seven years, Garza was sentenced to 16 months, Denton to 41 months, and Shea to 36 months. Parker-Dipeppe received no prison time.

== Devon Arthurs ==
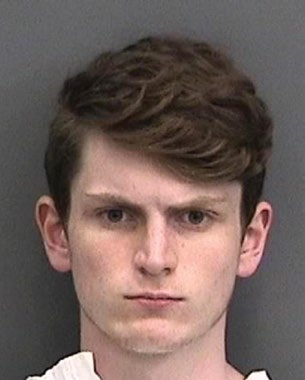
Mugshot of Devon Arthurs

An 18-year-old member, Devon Arthurs, of Tampa Palms, Florida, converted to Islam and described himself as a "Salafist National Socialist." In May 2017, Arthurs was accused of killing two of his roommates and fellow Atomwaffen Division members with a WASR-10 assault rifle in retaliation after they ridiculed his conversion. Arthurs was arrested following a hostage situation, during which he allegedly told police that he had shot 22-year-old Jeremy Himmelman and 18-year-old Andrew Oneschuk earlier that day.

In 2018, following competency evaluations by two court-appointed experts (a neuropsychologist and a psychologist), Arthurs was ruled incompetent to stand trial. He spent more than a year at the Florida State Hospital where he received treatment to make him competent to stand trial. Arthurs was charged with two counts of first degree murder, in addition to kidnapping and firearms charges. In December 2019, several experts testified that Arthurs has schizophrenia and bipolar disorder among other conditions, experiences hallucinations and believes he can communicate with the dead. It was opined that Arthurs is incapable of being restored to competency and should be returned to the Florida State Hospital. In May 2020, after additional exams ordered by the judge, he was yet again deemed incompetent to stand trial and returned to treatment. In May 2023, Arthurs pleaded guilty to two counts of second degree murder and three counts of kidnappings, and was sentenced to 45 years in prison.

During his interrogation, Arthurs repeatedly called the Atomwaffen Division dangerous:

"The Atomwaffen Division is a terrorist organization. It's a neo-Nazi organization that I was a part of. But the things that they were planning were horrible. They were planning bombings and stuff like that on countless people. They were planning to kill civilian life."

"Well, did they, were they specific in their plans?"

"Power lines, nuclear reactors, synagogues."

Arthurs later claimed that he had "prevented the deaths of a lot of people."

== Beau Merryman ==
In October 2019, a federal grand jury indicted 19-year-old Atomwaffen member Beau Merryman of Jefferson, Texas, accused of building and instructing others on how to build pipe bombs used to damage a federal building. He is charged with "distribution of information relating to explosives and destructive devices". He had previously been convicted of "Malicious Destruction" for vandalizing and defacing properties with neo-Nazi slogans earlier that year. His firearms were confiscated but returned after the previous conviction. Merryman pleaded guilty on November 4, 2021, to distribution of information relating to explosives and was sentenced to 41 months in prison.

== Samuel Woodward ==
In January 2018, Samuel Woodward of Newport Beach, California, was charged in Orange County, California, with the murder of Blaze Bernstein, an openly gay Jewish college student. Woodward is an avowed neo-Nazi and a member of Atomwaffen Division who had attended events and training camps. Blaze Bernstein had texted a friend that he had run into Woodward and believed they were "going to hook up", telling his friend it would be "legendary". Bernstein's body was found later buried in a shallow grave, having been stabbed at least 20 times. When questioned, Woodward stated that he had pushed Bernstein away as he tried to kiss him, but denied having harmed him. However, the investigators found Bernstein's blood on Woodward's knife and sleeping bag. The police went through his chat history and discovered messages from Woodward to his neo-Nazi friends where he wrote that he was baiting gay men and discussed a previous victim. In addition to this he posted a picture of a knife with the text "Texting is boring, but murder isn't".

According to chat logs subsequently published by ProPublica, one member of Atomwaffen Division wrote of the killing "I love this" and another praised Woodward as a "one man gay Jew wrecking crew". The murder of Blaze Bernstein was the fifth killing that was tied to Atomwaffen Division.

In August 2018, Woodward was charged with two counts of committing a hate crime because of Bernstein's sexual orientation and religion. Woodward, who has been linked to the murder by DNA evidence, pled not guilty. Woodward's attorney denied the hate crime allegations and stated that he, Woodward, has Asperger syndrome and issues regarding his own sexual identity. Due to the COVID crisis, Woodward has remained in confinement since his last court appearance in 2018; his trial was tentatively scheduled to begin sometime in 2021. In July 2022 an Orange County judge suspended criminal proceedings against Woodward pending mental health evaluation due to concerns he has a "serious mental disorder". In October 2022 two mental health experts determined that Woodward is competent to stand trial. Woodward was convicted of first-degree murder and hate crime in July 2024. On November 16, 2024 he was sentenced to life in prison.

== Camp Lejeune cell ==
Paul James Kryscuk, US Marine Justin Wade Hermanson, and former US Marines Liam Montgomery Collins, and Jordan Duncan were arrested and charged with firearm trafficking and manufacturing charges on November 20, 2020. Three of them were stationed together in Marine Corps Base Camp Lejeune. Prosecutors said they began coordinating deliveries of guns in January 2019, manufacturing fully automatic rifles and shipping them to North Carolina. According to the indictment; "[a] video shows the four participants outfitted in Atomwaffen masks giving the 'Heil Hitler' sign, beneath the image of a black sun. The last frame of the video displays the statement, 'Come home white man.'" Duncan became a private military contractor after leaving the Marines. The men also allegedly recruited more marines for the group they described as "guerilla organization" and "death squad". In addition, Kryscuk had filmed pornographic videos of sexual abuse of minority women. On August 20, 2021, it was announced that the men face additional charges for planning to destroy energy facilities using thermite. They faced 40 years in prison if convicted. A New Jersey National Guardsman named Joseph Maurino was indicted for allegedly having trafficked untraceable firearms to the men. Collins pleaded guilty to a charge of interstate transportation of a firearm and not guilty to the other charges.

Kryscuk was sentenced to six years and six months for conspiracy to destroy an energy facility. Collins was sentenced to 10 years for aiding and abetting the interstate transportation of unregistered firearms. Hermanson was sentenced to one year and nine months for conspiracy to manufacture firearms and ship interstate. Jordan Duncan was sentenced to seven years in prison for aiding and abetting and manufacturing a firearm in violation of law.

== Hunter Harrington ==
On September 11, 2024, Atomwaffen member Hunter Blake Harrington, 24, of LaGrange, Georgia, entered guilty plea to six violations of the Georgia Street Gang Terrorism and Prevention Act and Possession of a Sawed-off Shotgun, Sawed-off Rifle, and Silencer. Harrington was sentenced to 15 years in prison followed by 25 years on probation. Law enforcement first became aware of Harrington after a concerned citizen told the Troup County Sheriff's Office that they were worried about his "erratic behavior." The citizen informed law enforcement that Harrington possessed illegal weapons, was infatuated with mass killers, and was identified as a member of the Atomwaffen Division. During a search of Harrington's house, in addition to illegal sawed-off weapons, the police also found items consistent with the production of an improvised explosive device inside a safe that law enforcement had to use their own explosives to make safe.

== Skyler Philippi ==
On November 4, 2024, 24-year-old Skyler Philippi, of Columbia, Tennessee, was arrested and later charged with the use of a weapon of mass destruction and attempted destruction of an energy facility. Philippi allegedly planned to use a drone with an explosive device and try to attack the energy grid. He also talked about wanting to perpetrate a mass shooting and his membership in Atomwaffen. In preparation for the attack he participated in an occult ritual with other members and said the attack would be remembered “in the annals of history".

== Deceased members under investigation ==
=== Nicholas Giampa ===
On December 22, 2017, 17-year-old Nicholas Giampa shot and killed his girlfriend's parents in Reston, Virginia, after they forbade her to date him because of his neo-Nazi views. Giampa was open both about his admiration for James Mason, Siege, and his membership in Atomwaffen Division. After the killings, he shot himself but survived. Giampa was being held at a youth detention center in Fairfax, Virginia. In August 2018, it was ruled that the damage caused by the self-inflicted gunshot wound had left him incompetent to stand trial. Giampa was found dead in his cell on August 22, 2024.

=== Timothy Wilson ===
On March 24, 2020, the FBI executed a probable cause arrest for Timothy Wilson, 36, of Belton, Missouri. According to the FBI Wilson had at first considered bombing a mosque or a synagogue, but with the coronavirus crisis he decided to accelerate his plans and ultimately settled on a hospital "targeting a facility that is providing critical medical care in today's environment...in an attempt to cause severe harm and mass casualties." The FBI also stated that Wilson had taken "the necessary steps to acquire materials needed to build an explosive device". Counterterrorism agents intercepted Wilson as he was retrieving the bomb and Wilson, who was armed, died in the ensuing shootout with the agents.

Wilson was affiliated with the local Atomwaffen group and used the pseudonym "Werwolf" online. The FBI's office in Missouri issued an alert stating Wilson "shared instructions on how to make an [improvised explosive device] with another ... Domestic Terrorism subject", who was identified by ABC News as Jarrett Smith, another Atomwaffen member.

== See also ==
- List of neo-Nazi organizations
- Right-wing terrorism
