= U.S. Arsenal-Officers Quarters =

- U.S. National Register of Historic Places
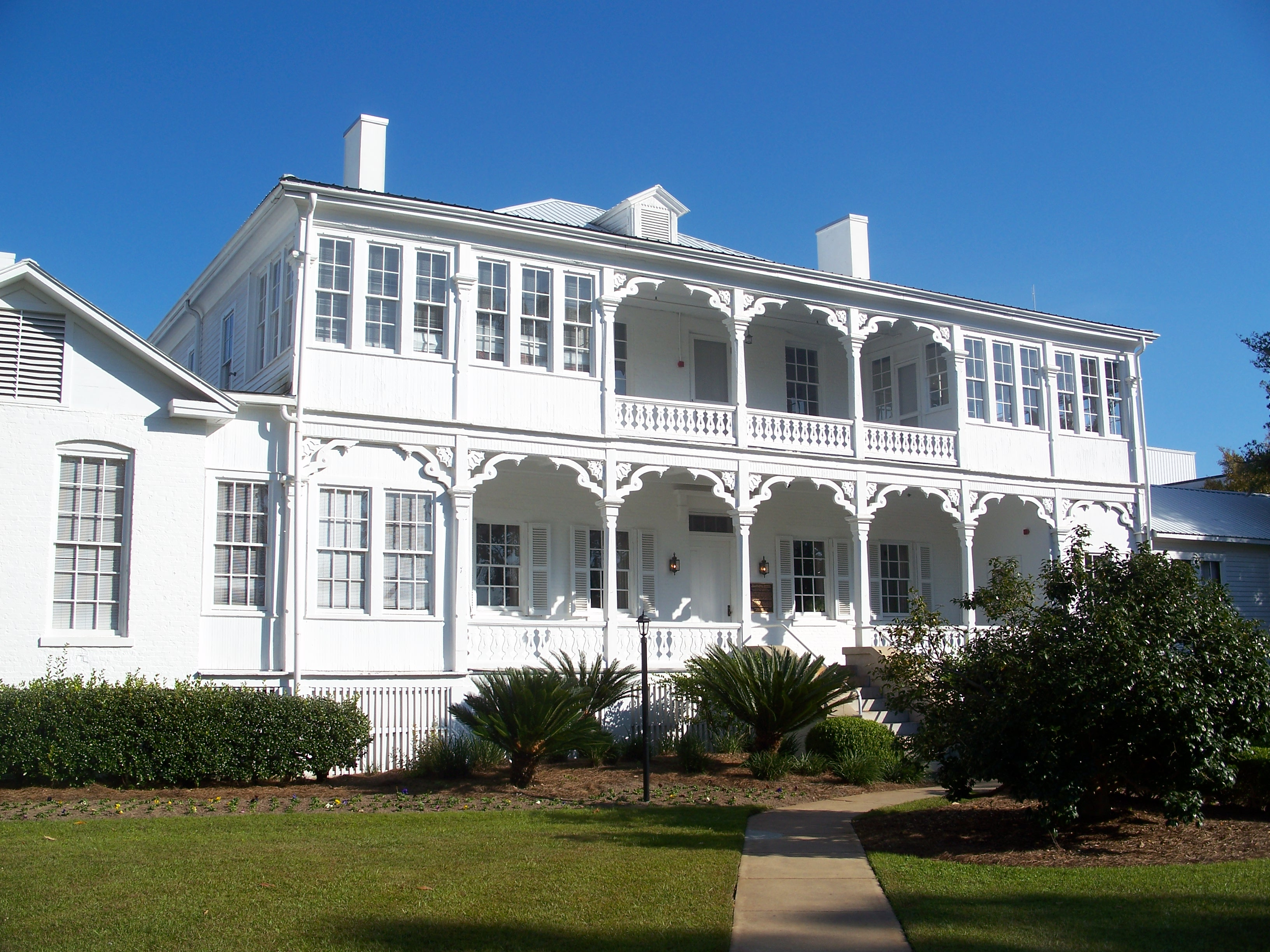

- Location within Florida Location within the United States
- Location: Chattahoochee, Florida
- Coordinates: 30°42′24″N 84°50′12″W
- Built: 1839
- Architectural style: Masonry Vernacular
- NRHP reference No.: 73000578
- Added to NRHP: July 2, 1973

The U.S. Arsenal-Officers Quarters (also known as the Mt. Vernon Arsenal or Chattahoochee Arsenal) is a historic site in Chattahoochee, Florida. It is located at 100 North Main Street, part of the Florida State Hospital on U.S. 90. On July 2, 1973, it was added to the U.S. National Register of Historic Places.
