= Chris Calhoun =

Korean War veteran

Chris Calhoun, 1934 (age 91–92) is a Korean War veteran, who was born in Opa-locka, Florida.

== Biography ==
Calhoun was committed to a Florida State Hospital, Chattahoochee, located in Gadsden County in 1956 following a suicide attempt. He suffered from what now is known as post-traumatic stress syndrome. He was released in 1962 after he spurred an investigation leading to state mental health care reforms.

While at Chattahoochee, Calhoun described the hospital’s conditions as a hellish prison in letters passed outside the hospital via visitors and friendly staff. He wrote how he had been raped by other patients, how staffers encouraged patients to fight one another and then subdued them by strangling, and how at least seven patients had died while he was there. Some of the patients died from the aforementioned strangling.

The abuse eventually was exposed by The Tampa Tribune. Governor Farris Bryant ordered an investigation that led to reforms in the early 1960s.

Calhoun moved to Los Angeles after his release. He was then inspired to tell the world his experiences. He did maintenance work for a theater chain in hopes that he would be able to meet members of the film industry who could assist him in his movie and book goals.

He came to meet screenwriter James Hicks, who agreed to write a script. It was turned down by several major studios before being accepted by Hemdale Film Corporation, a small British-owned, Los Angeles-based company that also produced Platoon, Hoosiers, The Last Emperor, and Salvador.

== In popular culture ==
A 1990 movie, Chattahoochee, stars Gary Oldman as Emmitt Foley, a fictional character based on Chris Calhoun.
