= Murder of Blaze Bernstein =

2018 murder in Lake Forest, California, US

- Bernstein in 2018
- Location: Lake Forest, California, U.S.
- Date: January 2, 2018; 8 years ago PST (UTC-08:00)
- Attack type: Murder by stabbing, hate crime, violence against LGBT people
- Weapon: Knife
- Victim: Blaze Bernstein
- Perpetrator: Atomwaffen Division
- Assailant: Samuel Woodward
- Motive: Neo-Nazism, Anti-LGBT extremism, Antisemitism
- Convictions: First-degree murder

On January 2, 2018, 19-year-old University of Pennsylvania sophomore Blaze Bernstein was killed after leaving home to meet an acquaintance at a park in California. Authorities later charged his former high school classmate Samuel Woodward with the murder, declaring that the incident was a hate crime.

Woodward was convicted and sentenced to life in prison without the possibility of parole.

== Background ==
=== Blaze Bernstein ===
Bernstein was born on April 27, 1998, in South Orange County, California, to Gideon Bernstein, an equity partner at Leisure Capital Management, and Jeanne Pepper, a former lawyer who retired from law in 2000 to raise their three children. After completing high school at Orange County School of the Arts, Bernstein attended the University of Pennsylvania.

=== Samuel Lincoln Woodward ===
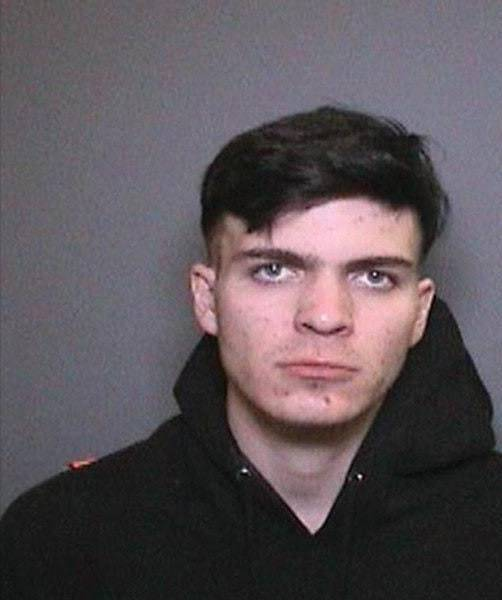
Woodward's mugshot, taken by the Orange County Sheriff's Department

The 20-year-old perpetrator, Samuel Lincoln Woodward, was born in Newport Beach, California and grew up in a household alongside his older brother. Woodward enrolled at the Orange County School of the Arts, but his father pulled him out during his junior year due to multiple reports of Woodward being homophobic towards gay men. Woodward finished his junior and senior years at Corona Del Mar High School before briefly attending California State University Channel Islands for his first two semesters.

== Murder and investigation ==
At the time of his murder, Bernstein was visiting his family in Lake Forest, California, during winter break. Woodward reached out to Bernstein via a website for men seeking men, and picked him up on January 2, 2018 for what Bernstein believed would be a romantic encounter. After driving to Borrego Park, Woodward stabbed Bernstein 28 times, killing him, and buried his body in a shallow grave. The prosecution stated that the Bernstein family had discovered that he had met with Woodward, but that Woodward misled them into believing that Bernstein had left with someone else. The Bernstein family reported their son missing on January 3.

On January 10, Bernstein's body was discovered. According to the prosecution, rain had washed away some of the mud concealing him. Two days later, Woodward, a member of the neo-Nazi terrorist group Atomwaffen Division, was arrested and charged with murdering Bernstein. As Bernstein was both openly gay and Jewish, authorities declared that he was a victim of a hate crime. Five deaths had links to the Atomwaffen Division over eight months from 2017 to early 2018.

== Legal case ==
The district attorney initially charged Woodward with murder and personal use of a deadly weapon. In August 2018, two charges of committing a hate crime were added because of Bernstein's sexual orientation. Woodward, who was linked to the murder scene by DNA evidence, pleaded not guilty. A pretrial hearing was held in January 2019.

Woodward's attorney stated that his client had Asperger syndrome which likely contributed to his social issues. He also said that Woodward was confused regarding his own sexual identity.

Woodward, who was 20 at the time of the crime, faced a sentence of life without parole if found guilty. He had initially faced a maximum sentence of 26 years in prison for the murder and weapons charges, prior to the addition of the hate crime enhancements. Woodward's bail was initially set at $5 million, but at a hearing in November 2018, the judge decided to deny bail altogether, remanding Woodward to custody pending trial.

Due to the COVID-19 pandemic, Woodward remained in confinement after his last court appearance in 2018. His trial was tentatively scheduled for the summer of 2021, though a series of postponements pushed it back another year.

On July 15, 2022, an Orange County judge temporarily suspended criminal proceedings after Woodward's defense attorney said she had concerns about his competence to stand trial. In late October 2022, mental health experts deemed Woodward competent, and a pre-trial hearing was scheduled for January 2023. In a subsequent court hearing on February 20, 2024, jury selection for the trial commenced. The trial began in April.

In the opening statement for the defense, Woodward's attorney admitted to his client's guilt, but argued that the murder was neither premeditated nor motivated by homophobia or antisemitism. Instead, the defense argued, Bernstein shared flirtatious messages between himself and Woodward on Tinder with other friends. Woodward, the defense claimed, wanted their relationship and any mention of his sexuality to remain between the two of them, as his father was homophobic and known to call gay men "sodomites", among other terms.

The police went through Woodward's chat history and discovered messages from Woodward to his neo-Nazi friends where he wrote that he was baiting gay men and discussed a previous victim he had attacked. In addition to this he posted a picture of a knife with the text "Texting is boring, but murder isn't."

The prosecution argued in their opening statements that online radicalization encouraged Woodward's already-conservative upbringing into extremism, and that the murder of Bernstein was an anti-gay and anti-Jewish hate crime, mentioning several emails allegedly sent by Woodward, photographs of Woodward with known extremists, and Woodward's dropping out of Channel Islands to train with the Atomwaffen Division in Texas. In the opening days of the trial, Bernstein's mother, Jeanne Pepper, took the stand, establishing that her family were practicing Jews, laying the framework for the prosecution's case. The defense focused on the text message exchanges between Bernstein and Woodward.

On July 3, 2024, six and a half years after the crime, Woodward was found guilty of murdering Bernstein. Woodward was sentenced to life in prison without the possibility of parole on November 15, 2024. He was imprisoned at Wasco State Prison but was later transferred to California State Prison, Sacramento, where he is imprisoned as of 2025.

== See also ==
- Antisemitism in the United States
- Antisemitism in the United States in the 21st century
- Gay and trans panic defense
- History of antisemitism in the United States
- History of violence against LGBT people in the United States
- Timeline of antisemitism in the 21st century
- Violence against LGBT people
- List of antisemitic incidents in the United States
- List of solved missing person cases (post-2000)
- Pittsburgh synagogue shooting – 2018 mass shooting in Pennsylvania, U.S.
- Matthew Shepard – American hate crime and murder victim (1976–1998)
- Murders of Gary Matson and Winfield Mowder – 1999 murder of a gay couple in Redding, California
