= Cinco (crater) =

Crater on the Moon

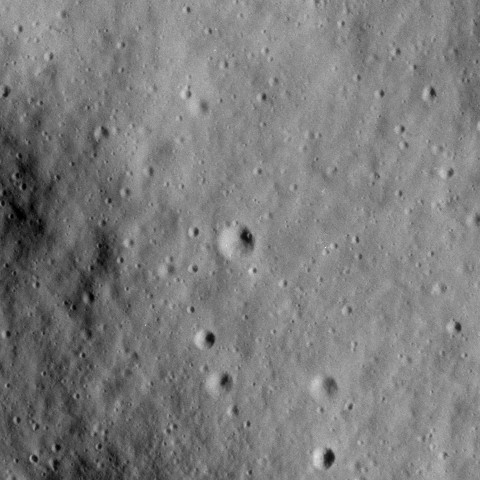
- Apollo 16 image a at center, b, c, d, and e at bottom
- Coordinates: 9.10°S 15.52°E
- Diameter: 70 m
- Eponym: Astronaut-named feature

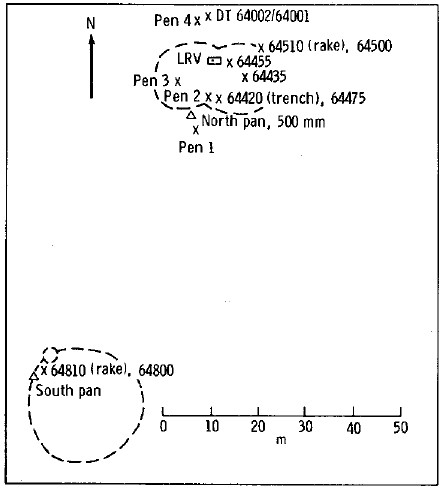
Planimetric map of Station 4 from the Apollo 16 Preliminary Science Report. X indicates sample locations, 5-digit numbers are LRL sample numbers, rectangle is lunar rover (dot indicates TV camera), black spots are large rocks, dashed lines are crater rims or other topographic features, and triangles are panorama stations.

Cinco is a small crater in the Descartes Highlands of the Moon visited by the astronauts of Apollo 16. The crater is one of a group of five (hence the name, Spanish for five) craters that were collectively called the Cinco craters during the Apollo 16 mission. The craters were designated a, b, c, d, and e, and the largest (a) was officially named Cinco after the mission in 1973 by the IAU.

On April 21, 1972, the Apollo 16 Apollo Lunar Module Orion landed about 4 km north of Cinco, northeast of the prominent South Ray crater. The astronauts John Young and Charles Duke explored the area over the course of three EVAs using a Lunar Roving Vehicle, or rover. They drove up Stone Mountain to Station 4, about 80 m west of Cinco crater, on EVA 2. The primary goal of sampling on Stone Mountain was to attempt to sample the Descartes Formation, although it remains unclear if the Descartes was sampled.

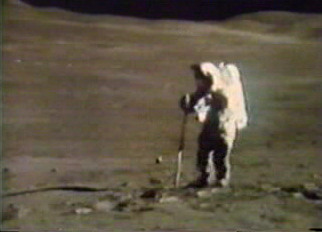
Astronaut Charles Duke extracting a double core at Station 4 on the west slope of Stone Mountain

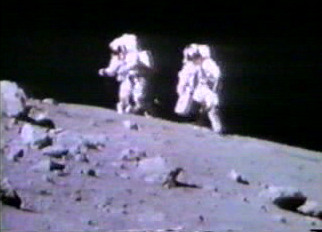
Astronauts Charles Duke (right) and John Young, walking back to the Lunar Roving Vehicle from the blocky rim crater at Station 4
