= Chattahoochee (film) =

1989 film by Mick Jackson

- Theatrical release poster
- Directed by: Mick Jackson
- Written by: James Hicks
- Produced by: Aaron Schwab; Faye Schwab
- Starring: Gary Oldman; Dennis Hopper; Frances McDormand; Pamela Reed; Ned Beatty; M. Emmet Walsh
- Cinematography: Andrew Dunn
- Edited by: Don Fairservice
- Music by: John E. Keane
- Distributed by: Hemdale Film Corporation
- Release dates: September 16, 1989 (TIFF); April 20, 1990 (United States)
- Running time: 97 minutes
- Country: United States
- Language: English
- Box office: $259,486

Chattahoochee is a 1989 American independent Southern Gothic drama film directed by Mick Jackson and written by James Hicks. The film stars Gary Oldman, Dennis Hopper, Frances McDormand, and Pamela Reed.

The film is based on the real-life experiences of Chris Calhoun in a state mental institution in the Florida panhandle. Calhoun later met James Hicks who wrote the script. It was turned down by several major studios before being accepted by Hemdale Film Corporation, a small British-owned, Los Angeles–based company that also produced Platoon, Hoosiers, The Last Emperor, and Salvador.

== Plot ==
Emmett Foley is an American hero of the Korean War who attempts to commit suicide, first by provoking local police and then by shooting himself in the chest. After his recovery, he is sent to the Florida State Hospital, an institution in Chattahoochee, Florida, where he fights against doctors and staff who are terrorizing and torturing their patients. His efforts eventually led to sweeping reforms in the Florida mental health system.

== Cast ==
- Gary Oldman as Emmett Foley
- Dennis Hopper as Walker Benson
- Frances McDormand as Mae Foley
- Pamela Reed as Earlene
- Matt Craven as Lonny
- William DeAcutis as Missy
- Gary Klar as Clarence
- Lee Wilkof as Vernon
- William Newman as Jonathan
- Richard Portnow as Dr. Debner
- Timothy Scott as Harley
- Ned Beatty as Dr. Harwood
- M. Emmet Walsh as Morris
- Wilbur Fitzgerald as Duane

== Production ==
Filming took place on location in and around the city of Columbia, South Carolina from October to December of 1988. Scenes substituting for the Florida State Hospital were shot at the former South Carolina State Hospital.

== Basis ==
The main character, Emmitt Foley, is a fictional character based on Chris Calhoun. Chattahoochee appeared in theaters nationwide May 11, 1990. Another famous person institutionalized at Chattahoochee was Ruby McCollum, the African-American woman who shot state senator-elect, Dr. C. Leroy Adams in 1952. Her case brought many of these same practices to light.

== Reception ==
Chattahoochee appeared in theaters nationwide May 11, 1990. (Theatrical Release Date: April 20, 1990) The film holds a 9% rating at Rotten Tomatoes based on 11 reviews, with an average score of 4.5 out of 10. Oldman compared the responses to Chattahoochee and his 1986 film Sid and Nancy, feeling the former was underappreciated and the latter overrated. He described Chattahoochee as "really good" work.
