= Florida State Hospital =

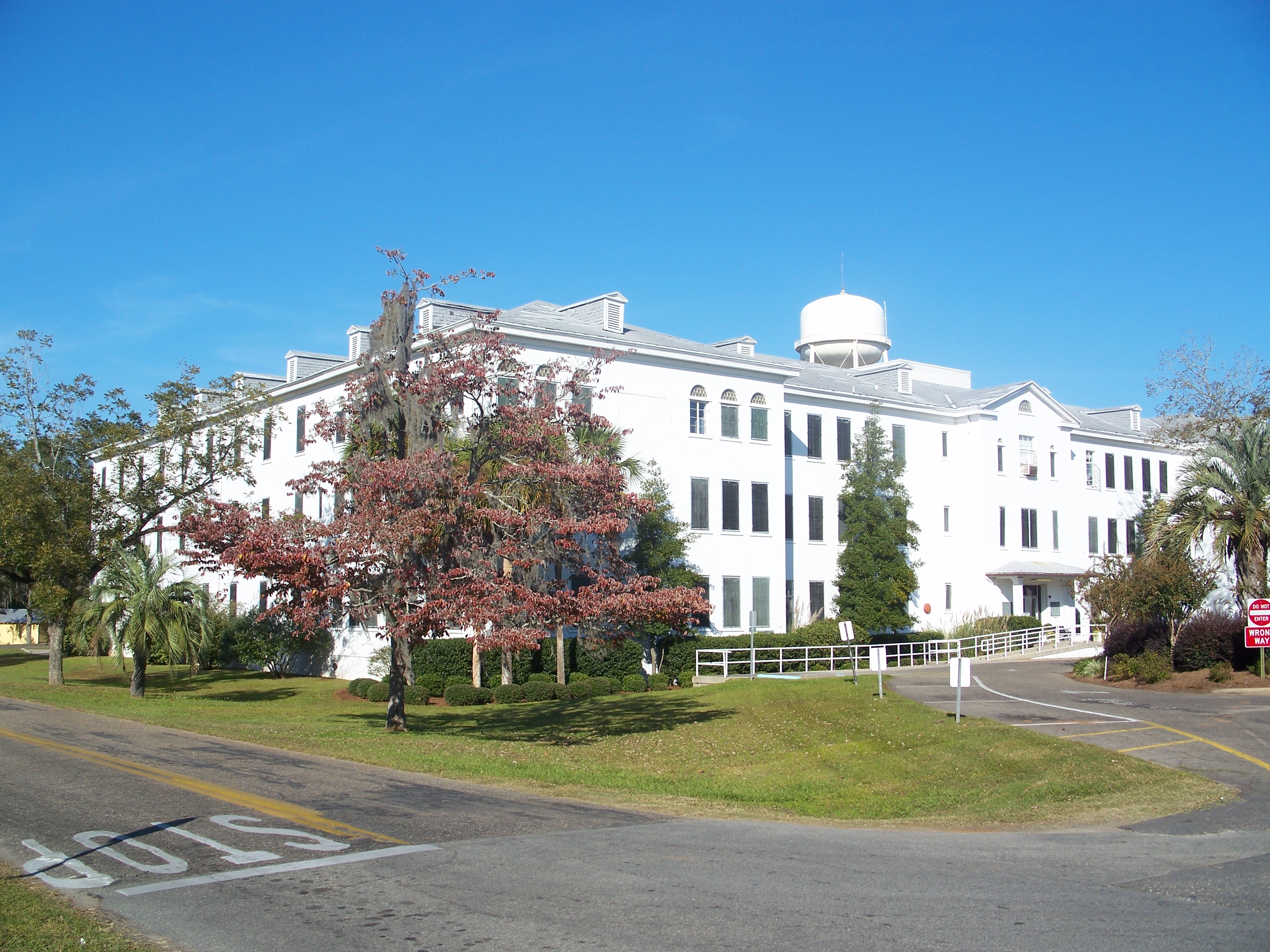
- Amos Building, near main entrance

Geography
- Location: Chattahoochee, Florida, United States
- Coordinates: 30°42′24″N 84°50′12″W

Organization
- Type: Specialist

Services
- Speciality: Psychiatric hospital

History
- Former name: Florida State Hospital for the Insane
- Opened: 1876

Links
- Lists: Hospitals in Florida

Florida State Hospital (FSH) is a hospital and psychiatric hospital in Chattahoochee, Florida. Established in 1876, it was Florida's only state mental institution until 1947. It currently has a capacity of 1,042 patients. The hospital's current Administration Building is on the National Register of Historic Places.

The facility's property previously served as a military arsenal during the Seminole Wars and the American Civil War, and later became the site of Florida's first state prison. It was subsequently refurbished as a mental hospital, originally known as Florida State Hospital for the Insane, which opened in 1876. It gained notoriety over the course of its long history. It was sued in O'Connor v. Donaldson, a case that went to the US Supreme Court, which ruled that the hospital had illegally confined one of its patients. The decision contributed to the deinstitutionalization movement, which resulted in changes to state laws and the closure of many public mental institutions in the country. The hospital today treats patients with severe mental disabilities who have been civilly or forensically committed to the institution.

== Early history ==
The hospital campus was originally the site of the Apalachicola Arsenal, built in the 1830s and named after the nearby Apalachicola River. The hospital's current Administration Building was adapted from the original Officers' Quarters of the Arsenal and is listed on the National Register of Historic Places. The Arsenal facility served as a supply depot during the Seminole Wars. The first engagement of the American Civil War in Florida took place here on January 6, 1861 when a Confederate militia unit from Quincy overcame Union soldiers at the Arsenal.

In 1868, Florida Governor Harrison Reed converted the arsenal property at Chattahoochee into Florida's first penitentiary. Florida's first recorded inmate was Calvin Williams, incarcerated in Chattahoochee in November 1868 for the crime of larceny and sentenced to one year. By 1869 there were 42 inmates and 14 guards.

In 1871, the prison was put under civilian jurisdiction. Malachi Martin was appointed as warden, gaining a reputation for cruelty and corruption. He used prison labor for his personal benefit to build houses and tend his personal vineyards, amassing a huge fortune. The book The American Siberia, written in 1891, portrayed the Chattahoochee prison as a place of relentless barbarity. After the prisoners were relocated in 1876 to a prison at Raiford, Florida, the facility was adapted as a state hospital.

== Hospital ==
In 1876, the prison was refurbished and established by the Reconstruction era legislature as the Florida State Hospital for the Insane, the state's first mental institution. It was an effort by the legislature to establish some public welfare institutions to assist residents in the state.

Over time, the hospital was investigated for allegations of mistreatment of patients, especially as treatment standards changed.

The hospital was sued in O'Connor v. Donaldson (1975), a case that reached the United States Supreme Court. Kenneth Donaldson, a patient held there, sued the hospital and staff for confining him for fifteen years against his will. The court ruled that he had been illegally held.

The decision, as interpreted by the American Civil Liberties Union (ACLU), means that it is unconstitutional to commit for treatment persons who are not imminently a danger to themselves or others and who are capable to a minimal degree of surviving on their own. This interpretation has hampered efforts to implement changes in commitment laws throughout the United States, as most states insist the person meet the "imminent danger" standard, accepting the ACLU's interpretation of the O'Connor v. Donaldson case. The ruling contributed to the deinstitutionalization movement in the United States, resulting in the shutting down of many large, public psychiatric hospitals.

== Current population ==
The hospital treats individuals with severe and persistent major mental illnesses. Two categories of patients are treated at the hospital; those civilly committed under Statute 394, who represent a small portion of the hospital's residents; and those forensically committed under Statute 916. The Civil portion of the hospital houses adult and elderly individuals who have been civilly committed to the hospital, and forensic residents who have been "stepped down" to the civil unit. The civil units are also known as Forensic Transition units.

Florida State Hospital also maintains a forensic wing for the Florida Department of Corrections to care for inmates who have been adjudicated through the criminal justice system to be incompetent to proceed to trial, or not guilty by reason of insanity. The current maximum housing capacity is 491 residents in civil units and 646 residents in forensic units.

The goal of the hospital's efforts is recovery. The hospital works to restore competency to residents adjudicated incompetent to proceed to trial. Residents receive competency training in both forensic and civil units. The amount of time needed to restore competency varies from a month or two, to up to five years. However, by statute, a patient cannot be committed for more than five years as incompetent to proceed. Upon five years of commitment that patient will be returned to court to have his/her charges dropped or commuted in some way. For residents adjudicated not guilty by reason of insanity, the hospital works to assist the resident in transitioning back into community living by learning appropriate activities for daily living, and social cues. Hospital staff ensure the resident is no longer at risk of reoffending before recommending to the judge that the patient is ready for a conditional release to the community. Unlike patients committed as "Incompetent to Proceed," those committed as "Not Guilty by Reason of Insanity" have no time limit on their commitment. They can remain committed by their presiding judge until their recovery is complete.

== Competency to be executed ==
One of the tasks of the forensic psychologists in the forensic wing is to evaluate an inmate's competency to be executed, as common law holds that the insane cannot be executed. This is a result of Ford v. Wainwright (1986). A Florida inmate on death row appealed his case to the United States Supreme Court, declaring he was not competent to be executed. The court ruled that a forensic professional must make that evaluation and, if the inmate is found incompetent, provide treatment to aid in his gaining competency so the execution can take place. Providing treatment to an individual to enable that person to become competent to be executed puts mental health professionals in an ethical dilemma.

== Historic place ==
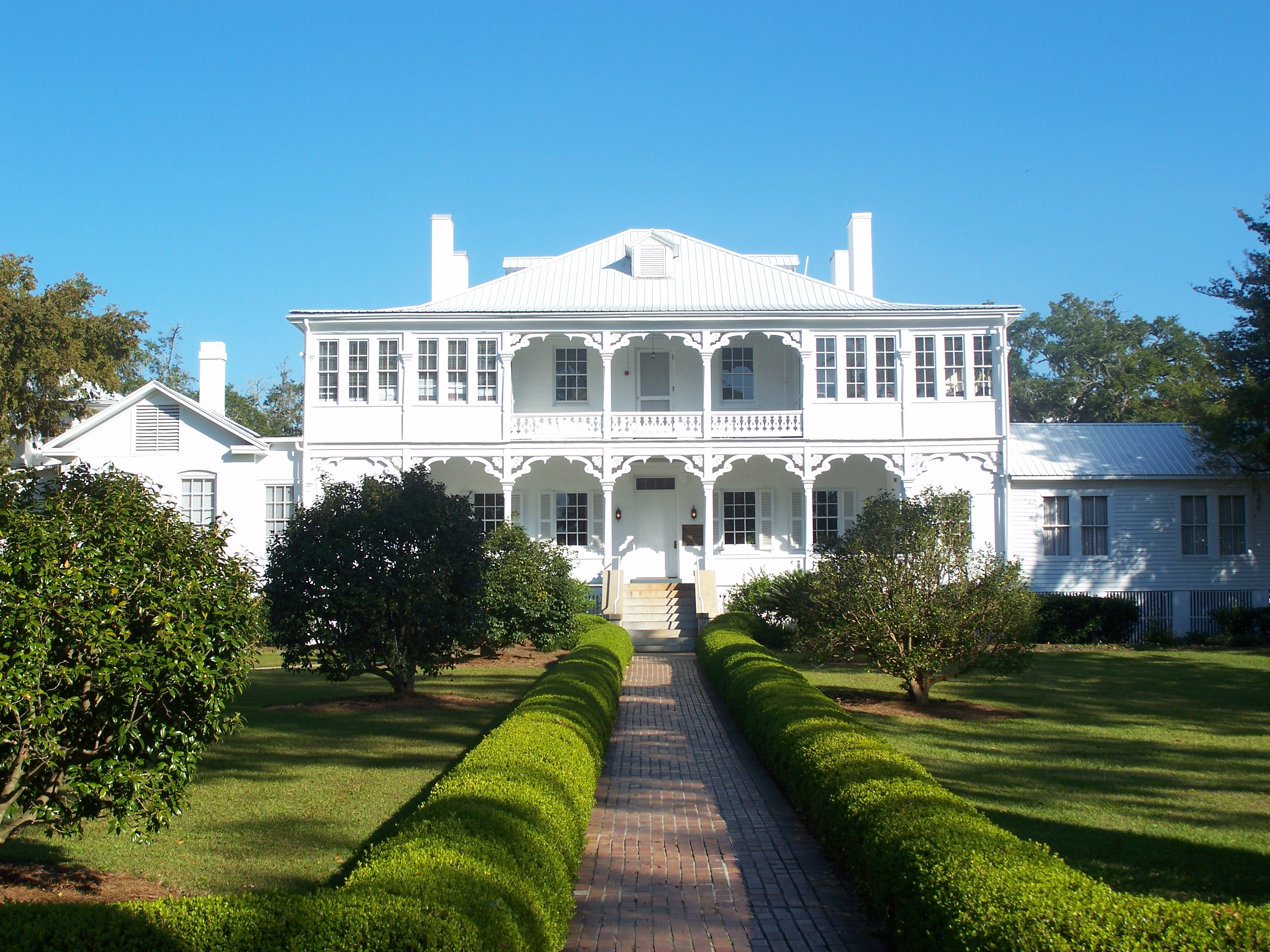
Hospital Administration Building

The former arsenal and current Administration Building of Florida State Hospital is listed on the National Register of Historic Places. Built in 1839 as the U.S. Arsenal-Officers Quarters, it is a two-story masonry brick main building, with 1 1/2-story wings and front and rear porches framed with carved brackets.

== Notable inmates ==
- Victor Licata, axe murderer, whose slaying of his family in 1933 influenced the idea that marijuana causes criminal insanity
- Ruby McCollum, was a married African-American woman convicted of shooting and killing a prominent white doctor, C. Leroy Adams in Live Oak, Florida; she said he forced her to have sex and to bear his child. Her conviction was overturned on appeal by a technicality, and she was ruled mentally incompetent to go to a second trial. She was committed to the hospital in 1954 and released under the Baker Act in 1974. In the 21st century, at least three new books have been published about her case, and two documentary films have been made, one in 2013 and one in 2014.
- Chris Calhoun, A Korean War vet who suffered from posttraumatic stress disorder. The film Chattahoochee was made about his experiences at the Florida State Hospital.
- John William Clouser, the "Florida Fox," was a former police detective who appeared for a time on the FBI Most Wanted List. Clouser escaped FSH in 1967 after having previously been committed in the wake of a kidnapping and armed robbery. He turned himself in to authorities 1974.
- Devon Arthurs, An 18-year-old convert to Salafist Islam who killed two of his Neo Nazi roommates for disrespecting his conversion.
- Jesse Delbert Daniels, disabled man who was accused of a rape in Tavares before being committed to the state hospital for 14 years without ever standing trial before finally being released on appeal.

== See also ==
- O'Connor v. Donaldson
- Ford v. Wainwright
- Gideon v. Wainwright
