= Samuel Fleischman =

Samuel Fleischman, sometimes spelled Fleishman, was a clothing merchant murdered by the Ku Klux Klan in the Florida Panhandle in 1869. Fleischman swore out an affidavit about the threat he received from a local Klan leader and store proprietor James Coker. Fleischman went to Tallahassee to seek protection but refused to stay out of Marianna, Florida as instructed by the Klan and was murdered during his return trip. The killing was part of a wave of attacks and unrest during the Reconstruction Era known as the Jackson County War.

Fleischman was Jewish. He lived in Ohio until 1851 and settled in Marianna, Florida, the county seat of Jackson County, Florida. Fleischman did business with African Americans. He was ordered to leave Marianna by the Klan and when he refused he was escorted out by armed men. His body was found on the road from Tallahassee.

== See also ==
- Antisemitism in Florida
- Lynching of American Jews
