= Emily Gorcenski =

American data scientist and activist

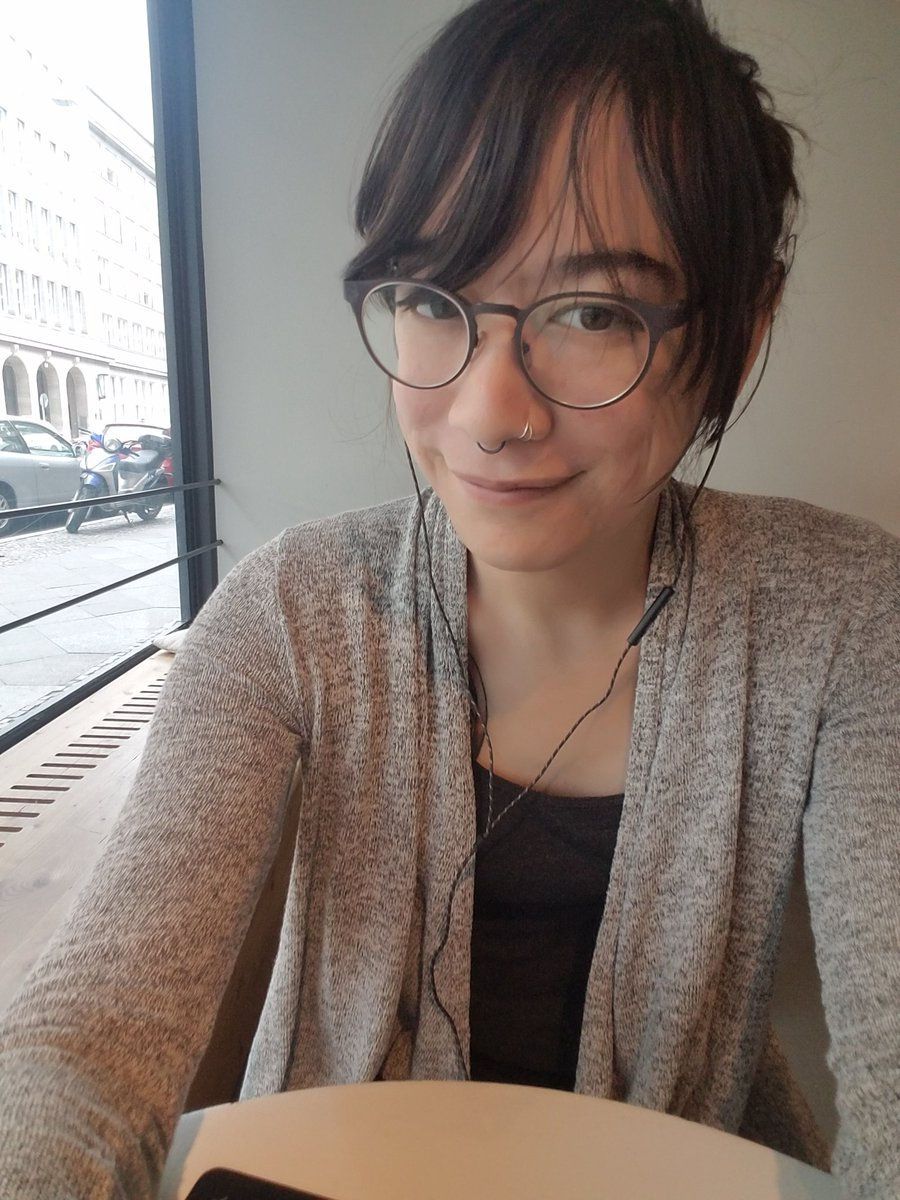
- Born: 1982 (age 43–44)
- Education: Rensselaer Polytechnic Institute
- Occupations: Data scientist; activist
- Scientific career
- Website: emilygorcenski.com

Emily F. Gorcenski (born 1982) is an American data scientist and activist who now resides in Germany. Gorcenski was a counter-protester at the Unite the Right rally in 2017, and subsequently created the site 'First Vigil' to track the trial information of white nationalists.

== Early life and education ==
Emily Gorcenski grew up in Columbia, Connecticut. She attended Rensselaer Polytechnic Institute where she studied aeronautical and mechanical engineering before graduating with a degree in mathematics. Gorcenski is a transgender woman.

== Activism ==
=== Unite the Right ===
In August 2017, Gorcenski was a counter-protester at the Unite the Right rally in her city of residence of Charlottesville, Virginia. At the August 11 "torch" rally, she was sprayed in the face with pepper spray by white supremacist Christopher Cantwell, who pleaded guilty to charges of assault and was barred from Virginia for 5 years, and was also attacked by Atomwaffen Division member Vasillios Pistolis.

In the wake of her assault at the rally, Gorcenski and one other counter-protester pressed charges against Cantwell, who in turn filed a federal lawsuit against them. In response, Gorcenski and her co-defendant counter-sued Cantwell. In the lawsuit, Gorcenski was repeatedly misgendered by both Cantwell and his attorney, Elmer Woodard. Woodard's motions to have the court refer to Gorcenski by her pre-transition name (and for the court to use male pronouns) were both denied. Both lawsuits were settled in 2018 with a mutual release of claims.

Due to her public opposition to the rally, Gorcenski was harassed online and doxxed. She told The Intercept that she had been victim to transphobic harassment from before the rally in Charlottesville. Gorcenski was swatted in October 2017 after the rally's organizer Jason Kessler reportedly doxxed her. Kessler was subsequently arrested, though charges were dismissed when new evidence showed Kessler did not control the account that posted Gorcenski's address. In 2018, due to safety concerns, Gorcenski left Charlottesville for Berlin, Germany, where she now resides.

=== Digital activism ===
Gorcenski's experiences at Unite the Right led her to use her skills as a data scientist to help identify and dox white nationalists and members of the alt-right engaged in criminal activity. Gorcenski created the website 'First Vigil' to track the trial information of white nationalists and associated individuals. The site uses court documents and other public records. Gorcenski was named one of the fifty most influential feminists in 2018 by Bitch magazine for her work in creating First Vigil. In 2016, Gorcenski criticized the ethics of a study by an independent researcher who released the private information on approximately 70,000 users of the dating website OkCupid. The study in question was widely panned for being unethical, racist, and a breach of user privacy. Gorcenski covered the issue in a discussion with Sarah Jeong at Mozfest in 2017. Gorcenski sometimes speaks about the ethics of emerging technology, such as consumer internet of things devices. In 2016, Gorcenski explored software quality controls for electronic voting machines, expressing concern for the apparent lack of mandatory standards. Gorcenski is active on Twitter, and Business Insider and the Daily Star have published stories about her 2022 posts on Elon Musk.

During the George Floyd protests in 2020, Gorcenski launched whentheycamedown, a people's history project to document the removal of statues of historical figures aligned with white supremacy and colonialism.

== Writing ==
Gorcenski is a sporadic political opinion writer. After president Donald Trump controversially stated that there were "very fine people on both sides" at the Charlottesville rally, Gorcenski wrote an op-ed for The Guardian where she argued that his speech demonstrated his unwillingness to criticize neo-Nazis, which emboldened white supremacy. Her criticism extends at times to the Democratic Party, where she takes issue with what she perceives as the exploitation of the terror attack at Unite the Right for political gains. As a transgender rights activist, she has written about healthcare concerns for transgender Americans.
