= Flag (crater) =

Lunar crater explored on Apollo 16

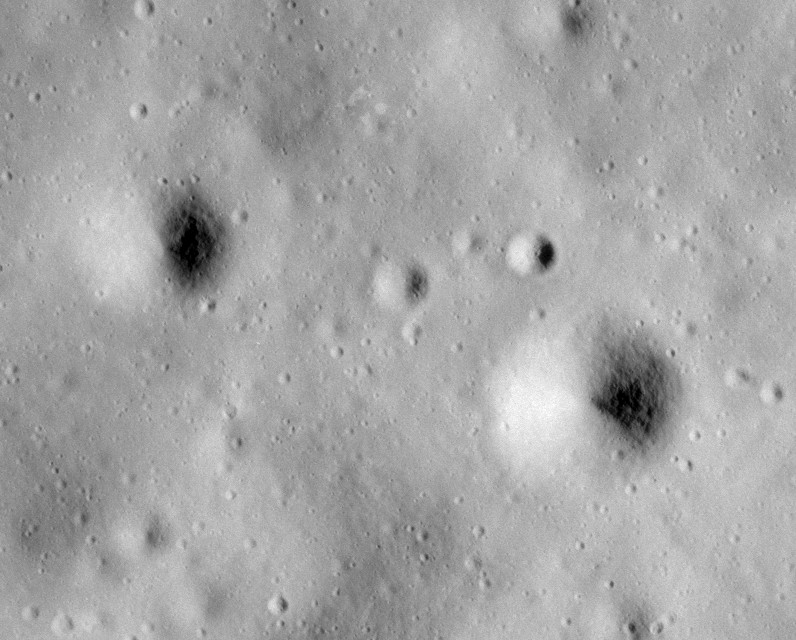
- Apollo 16 image, with Flag left of center and Spook right of center. Plum is the tiny crater on the southeast rim of Flag.
- Coordinates: 8.97°S 15.45°E
- Diameter: 240 m
- Eponym: Astronaut-named feature

Flag crater is a small crater in the Descartes Highlands of the Moon visited by the astronauts of Apollo 16. The name of the crater was formally adopted by the IAU in 1973. Geology Station 1 is adjacent to Flag, at the much smaller Plum crater.

On April 21, 1972, the Apollo 16 Apollo Lunar Module (LM) Orion landed about 1.5 km east of Flag, which is between the prominent North Ray and South Ray craters. The astronauts John Young and Charles Duke explored the area over the course of three EVAs using a Lunar Roving Vehicle, or rover. They drove to Flag on EVA 1.

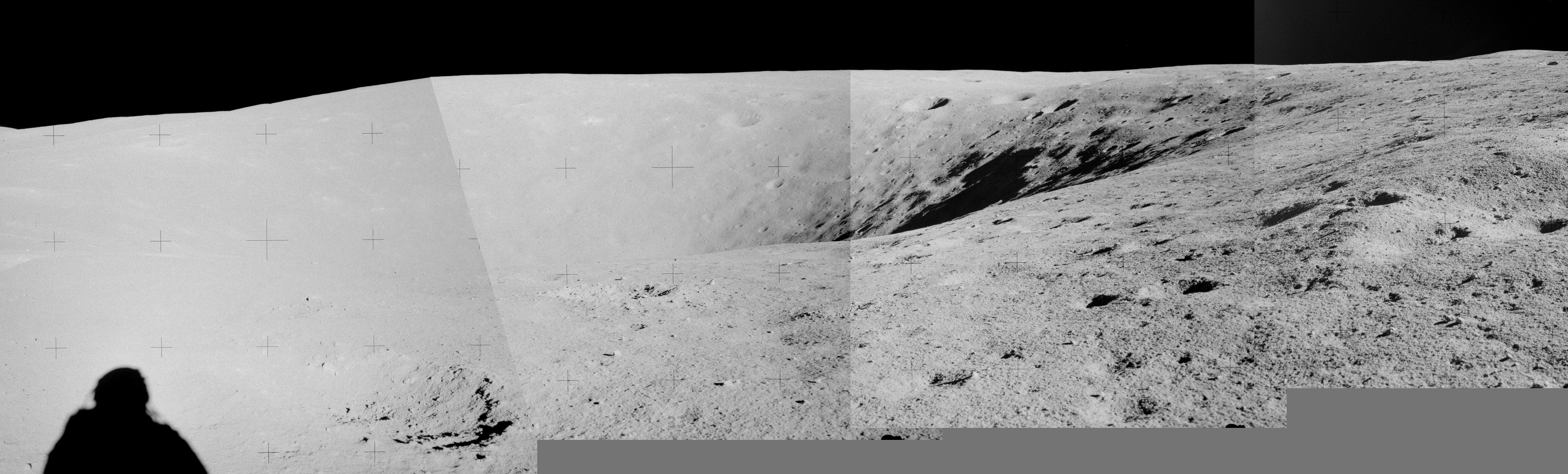
Panorama of Flag crater taken by Charlie Duke, facing northwest at center

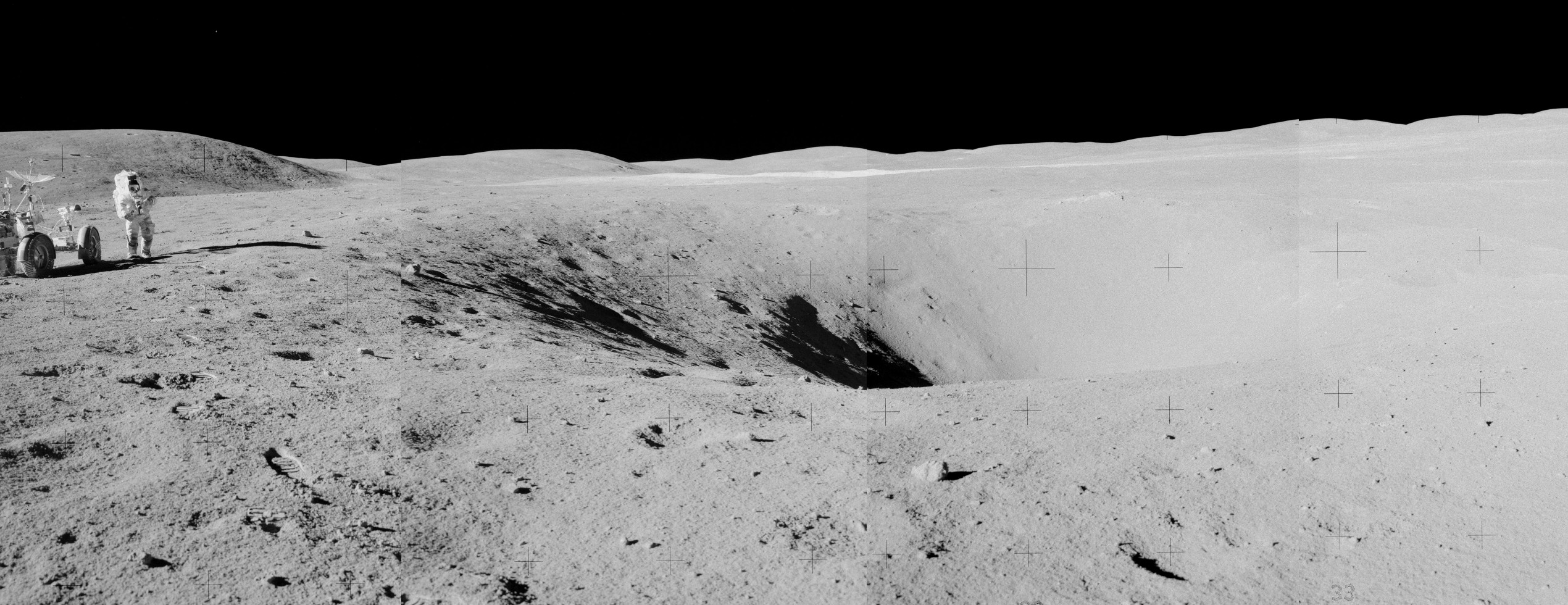
Panorama of Plum crater, to the left of the panorama above, facing southwest. Mission Commander John Young at left. The astronauts sampled soil in the foreground, and a boulder on the distal crater rim. Sample 61016, called Big Muley, is just above the right end of Young's shadow.

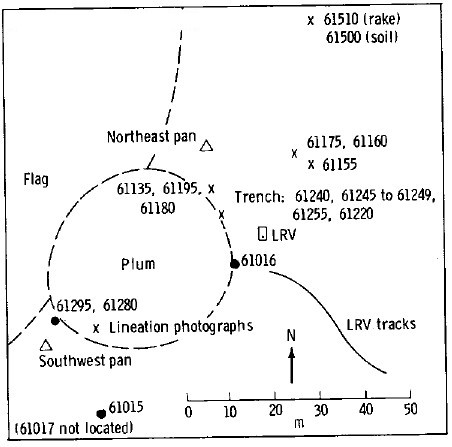
Planimetric map of Station 1 from the Apollo 16 Preliminary Science Report. X indicates sample locations, 5-digit numbers are LRL sample numbers, rectangle is lunar rover (dot indicates TV camera), black spots are large rocks, dashed lines are crater rims or other topographic features, and triangles are panorama stations.

Flag crater is approximately 240 m in diameter and over 20 m deep. The adjacent crater Plum is only about 30 m in diameter. The slightly larger crater Spook, also visited by the astronauts, lies less than 1 km to the east.

Flag cuts into the Cayley Formation of Imbrian age.

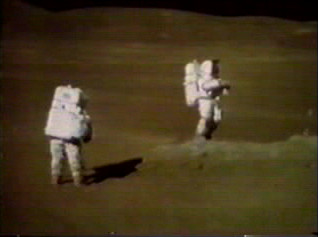
TV camera still of Duke (left) and Young on the rim of Plum. Duke remarked at this time, "John, you are just beautiful. That is the most beautiful sight." Young is standing next to a boulder from which sample 61295 was taken.

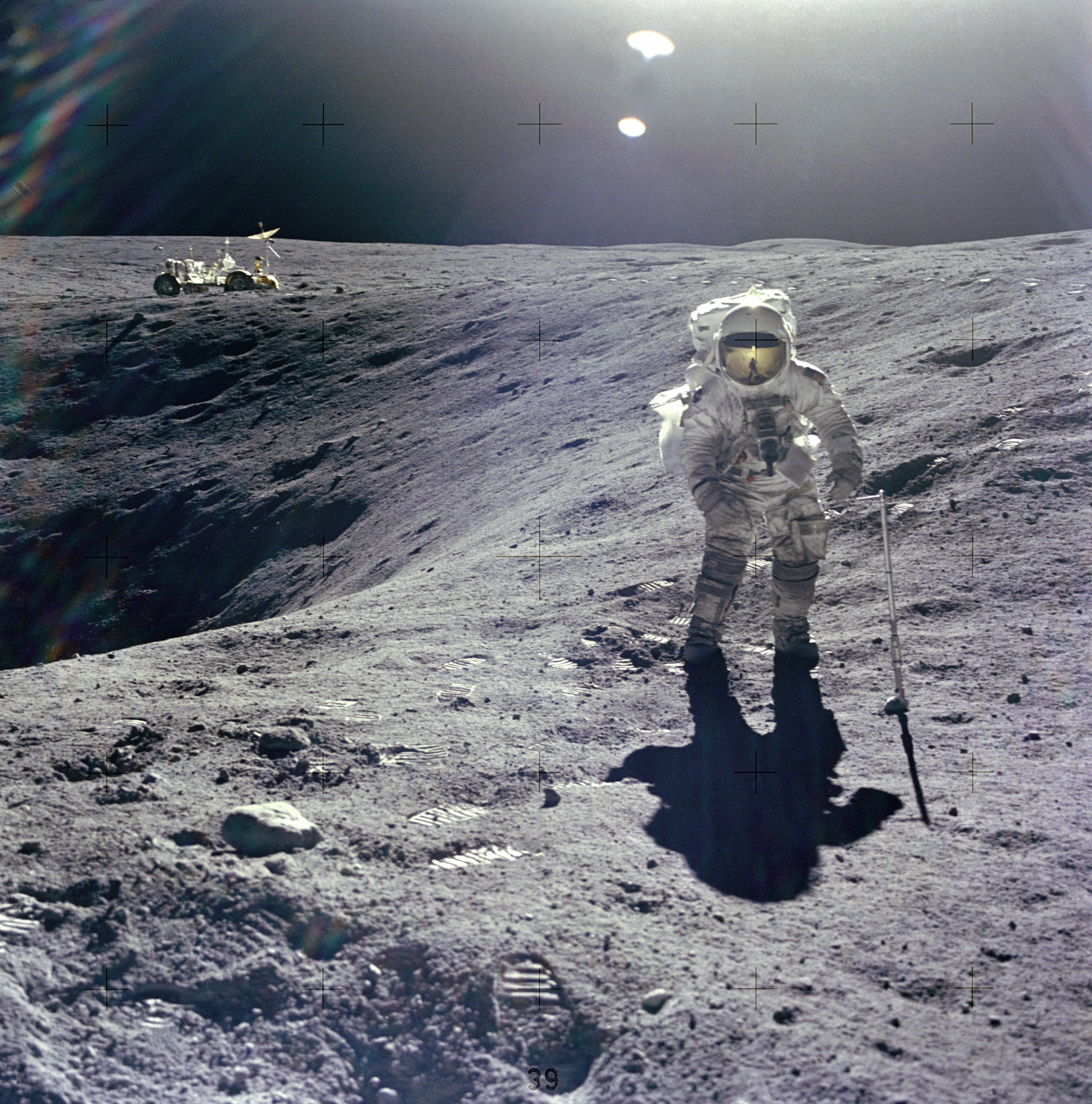
Young took this photo of Duke with Plum and the rover in the background from where he is standing in the above TV still.

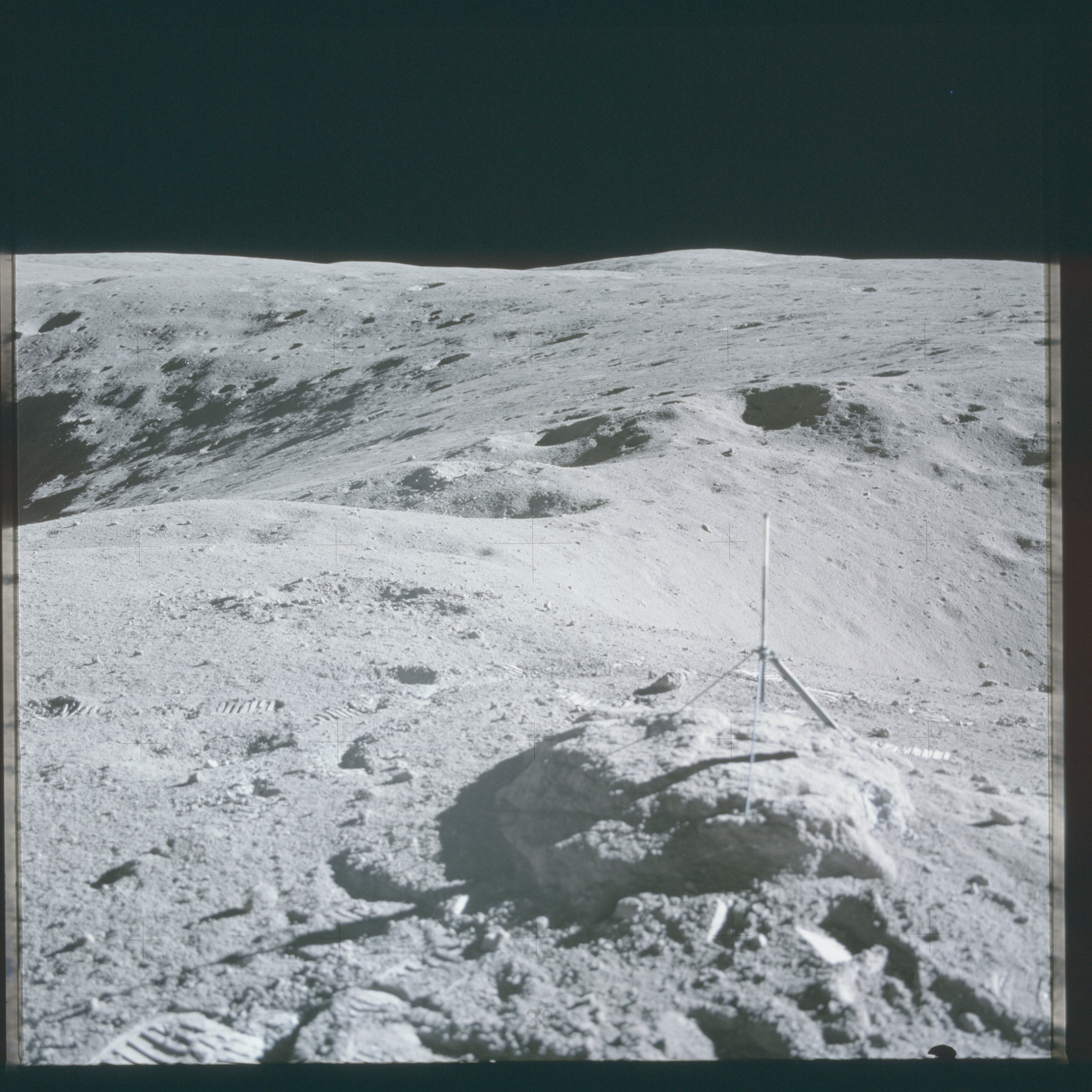
The ridge between Flag (left) and Plum (right)

== Samples ==
The following samples were collected from the vicinity of Plum and Flag crater (Station 1), as listed in Table 6-II of the Apollo 16 Preliminary Science Report, which does not include samples smaller than 25 g weight (of which there were many). Sample type, lithology, and descriptions are from the Lunar Sample Atlas of the Lunar and Planetary Institute.

Sample	Sample Type	Lithology	Photo	Description
61015	rock	breccia		coated with black glass on one side and is thought to be ejecta from South Ray crater
61016	rock	impact melt breccia		known as Big Muley; named after Bill Muehlberger, the leader of the Apollo 16 field geology team
61135	rock	regolith breccia		an ancient regolith breccia that became a closed system about 3.9 b.y. ago; and has a few zap pits
61155	rake	breccia		clast-rich "glassy impact melt"; has abundant white clasts, thin glass veins and glassy mesostasis
61156	rock	impact melt breccia		Tough, medium gray, poikilitic impact melt that has been thermally metamorphosed
61175	rock	fragmental breccia		Contains a high percentage of glass, with some agglutinate. It also contains a small, but significant, mare component
61195	rock	breccia		coherent, medium grey breccia with a glassy matrix and abundant clasts; zap pits are surrounded with wide spall zones
61295	rock	breccia		friable light matrix breccia with both light and dark clasts; rounded and has many zap pits
61536	rake	breccia		contains a large white clast held within a glass matrix, and has a thin glass coating on surface
61546	rake	breccia		vesicular chunk of glass with numerous small white clasts and micrometeorite craters on one side only
