= Spook (crater) =

Lunar crater explored on Apollo 16

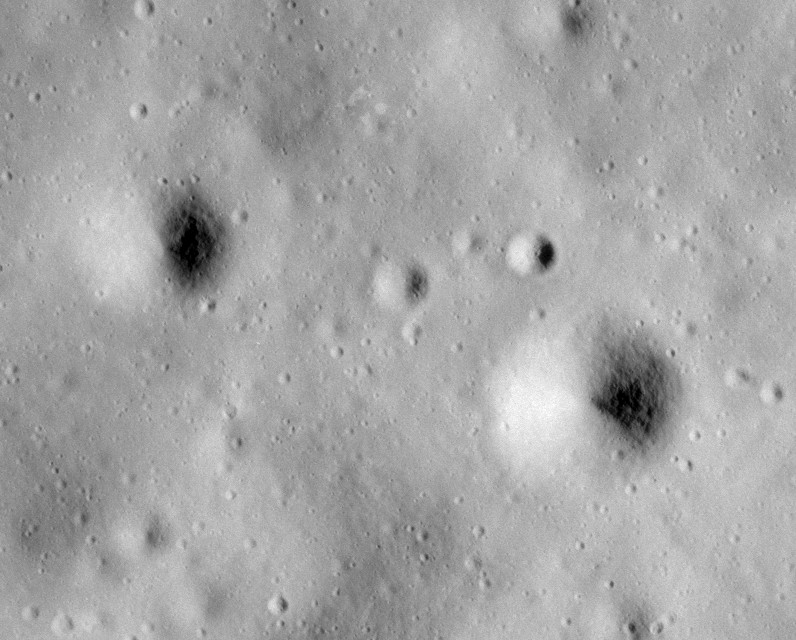
- Apollo 16 image, with Flag left of center and Spook right of center. Buster is the small crater north of Spook.
- Coordinates: 8.98°S 15.48°E
- Diameter: 340 m
- Eponym: Astronaut-named feature

Spook crater is a small crater in the Descartes Highlands of the Moon visited by the astronauts of Apollo 16. The name of the crater was formally adopted by the IAU in 1973. Geology Station 2 is adjacent to Spook, between it and the smaller, younger crater called Buster to the north of it.

On April 21, 1972, the Apollo 16 Lunar Module Orion landed about 500 m east of Spook, which is between the prominent North Ray and South Ray craters. The astronauts John Young and Charles Duke explored the area over the course of three EVAs using a Lunar Roving Vehicle, or rover. They stopped at Spook during EVA 1, on the way back to the LM from Flag crater.

Spook crater is approximately 340 m in diameter and over 20 m deep. Spook is about 550 m west of the landing site itself. The small, fresh crater called Buster is north of Spook. Many samples were collected at the south rim of Buster.

The Lunar Portable Magnetometer (LPM) was used to obtain a reading of approximately 180 γ (gamma) at Spook. This was one of five locations at the landing site where the LPM was used.

Spook cuts into the Cayley Formation of Imbrian age.

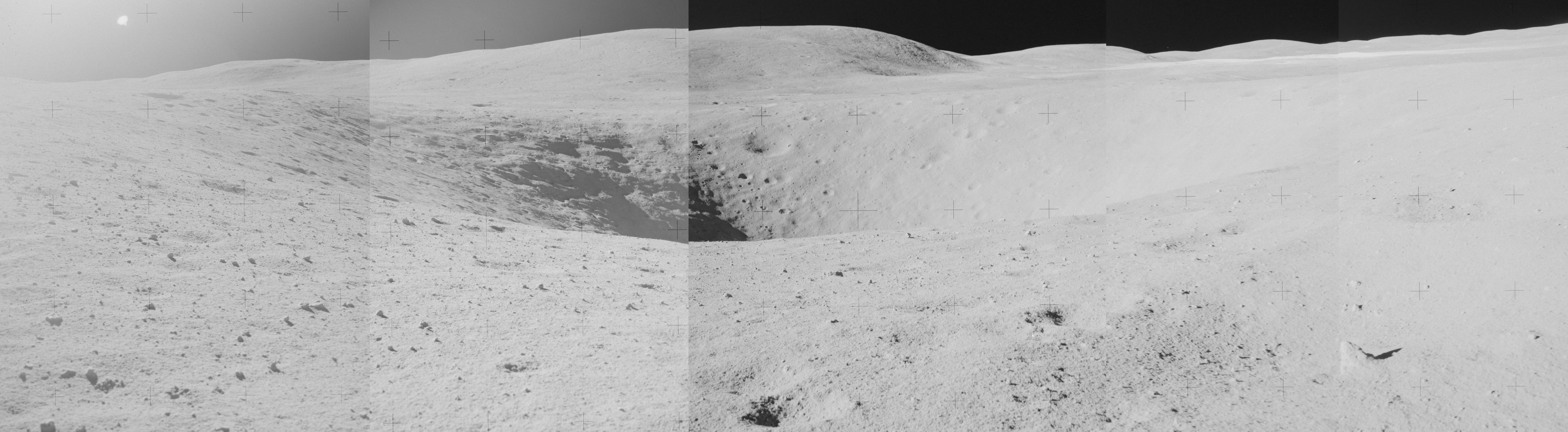
Mosaic showing Spook crater with Stone Mountain in the background. The white line near the horizon at right is the ejecta blanket of South Ray crater.

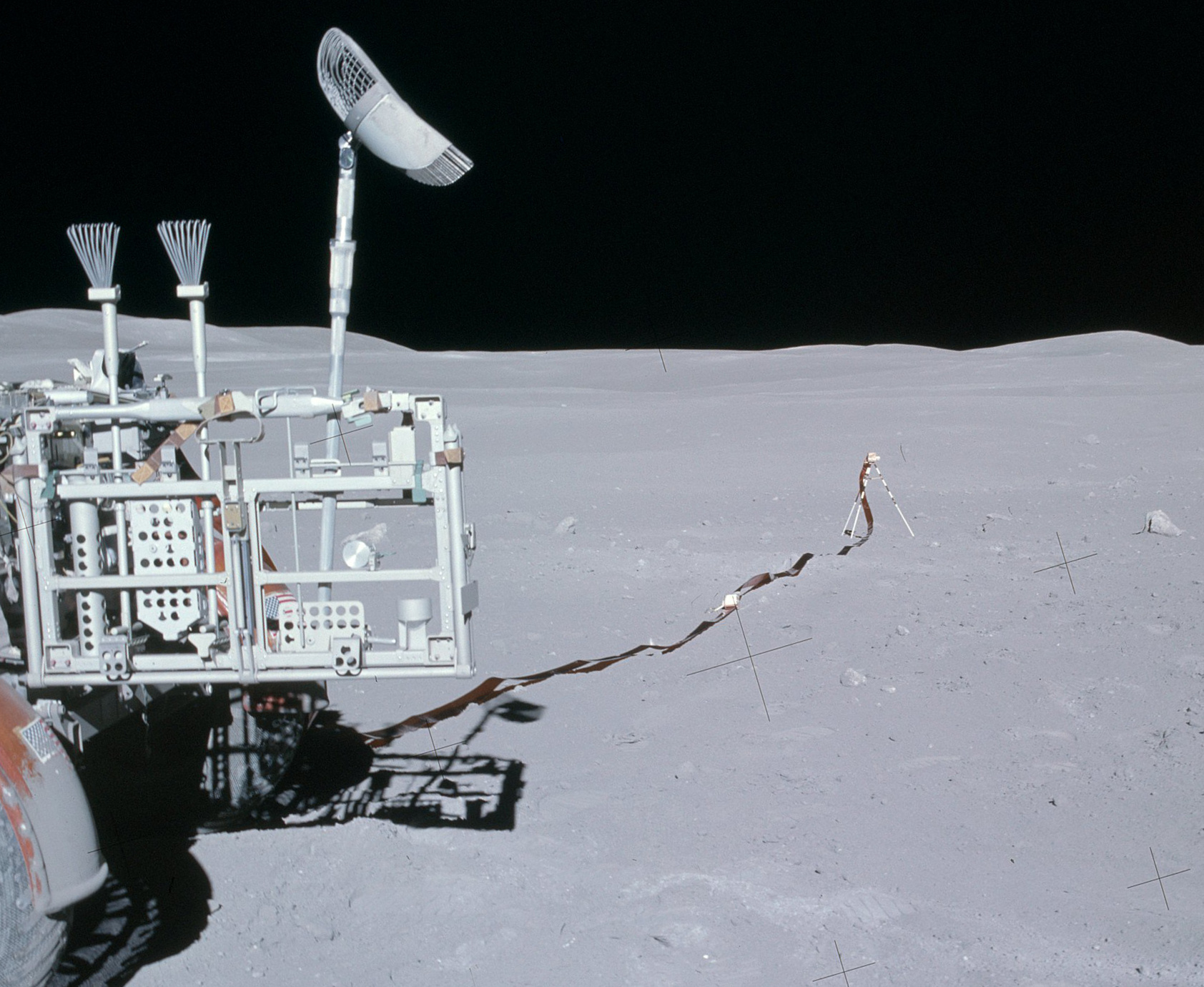
The Lunar Portable Magnetometer (LPM) was used to take a magnetic field measurement at the north rim of Spook

== Samples ==
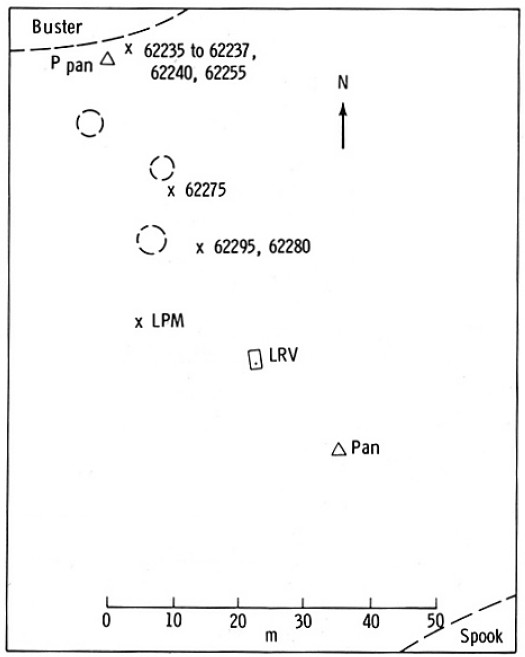
Planimetric map of Station 2 from the Apollo 16 Preliminary Science Report. X indicates sample locations, 5-digit numbers are LRL sample numbers, rectangle is the Lunar Roving Vehicle (dot indicates TV camera), black spots are large rocks, dashed lines are crater rims or other topographic features, and triangles are panorama stations. LPM is the location of the Lunar Portable Magnetometer reading.

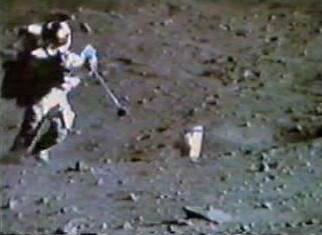
TV camera still of Charlie Duke's "juggling act" trying to catch sample 62275 at the rim of Buster crater. The sample is to the right of his helmet and above his outstretched hands.

The following samples were collected from the vicinity of Buster crater (Station 2), as listed in Table 6-II of the Apollo 16 Preliminary Science Report, which does not include samples smaller than 25 g weight (of which there were many). Sample type, lithology, and descriptions are from the Lunar Sample Atlas of the Lunar and Planetary Institute.

Sample	Sample Type	Lithology	In-situ Photo	Photo	Description
62235	rake	breccia			apparently homogeneous, coherent, hollocrystaline impact melt rock with classic poikilitic texture highly enriched in trace elements and siderophile elements and has been dated at 3.88 b.y., with an exposure history of 153 m.y.
62236	rake	rock			found to be a slowly-cooled plutonic rock (Takeda et al. 1979) with an age of ~4.3 b.y. (Borg et al. 1999).
62237	rock	anorthite			chalky white rock
62255	rock	breccia			has been crushed and granulated by shock and is penetrated with patches and veins of mafic melt
62275	rock	anorthite			very friable, chalky white rock that broke up into powder during handling in curatorial labs and has not been adequately studied.
62295	rake	impact melt breccia			blocky coherent impact melt rock with numerous micrometeorite pits on one side and none on the other
