= Great Scott (lunar sample) =

Rock retrieved from the Moon in 1971 by Apollo 15

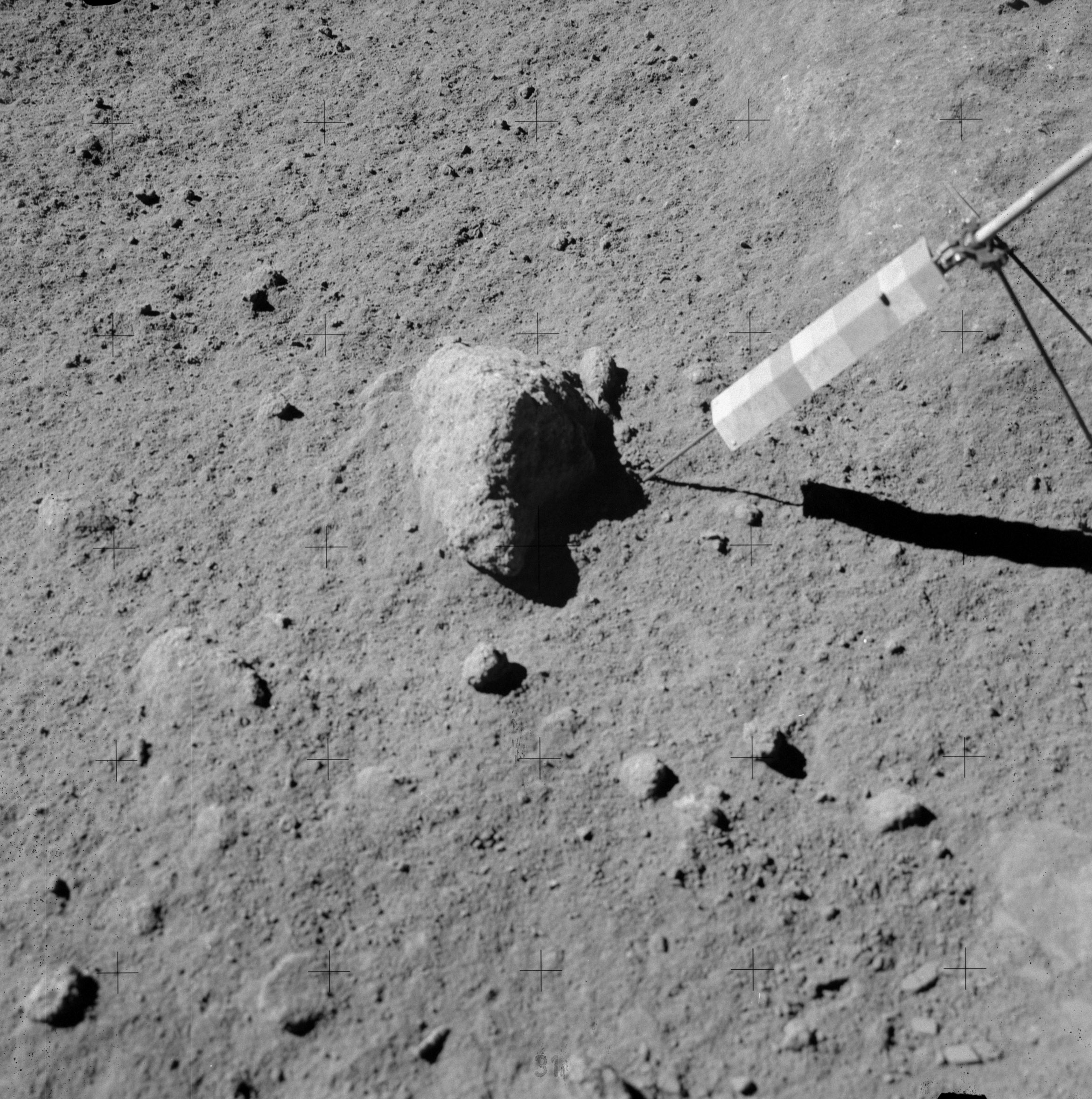
Great Scott on the lunar surface prior to collection. The object at right is a gnomon, used for scale.

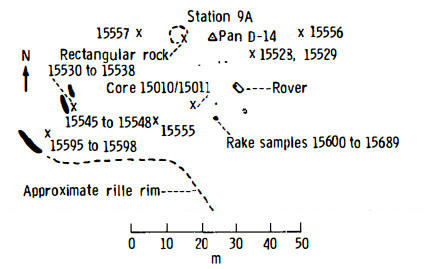
Station 9A planimetric map showing the location of Great Scott at 15555. "X" indicates sample locations, 5-digit numbers are LRL sample numbers, the rectangle is lunar rover (dot indicates TV camera), black spots are large rocks, dashed lines are crater rims or other topographic features, and triangles are panorama stations.

Lunar Sample 15555, better known as "Great Scott", is a lunar sample discovered and collected on the Apollo 15 mission in 1971 in the Hadley-Apennine region of the Moon. The rock is a 9.614 kg (21.20 lb) olivine-normative basalt. It is named after mission commander David Scott, and it is the largest sample returned to Earth from the mission, as well as the most intensively studied. It was collected by Scott on the rim of Hadley Rille, at station 9A.

Great Scott is currently stored at the Lunar Sample Laboratory Facility at the Lyndon B. Johnson Space Center. Pieces of it are on display at the National Museum of Natural History in Washington, DC, the Tellus Science Museum in the state of Georgia, the Madrid Deep Space Communications Complex in Spain, the LROC Lunar Exploration Museum at Arizona State University and the Science Museum in London, England.

The term Great Scott was in use as soon as the next mission, Apollo 16, because Charlie Duke used the term just before picking up Big Muley. Big Muley is the largest sample (11.7 kg) returned from the Moon, and Great Scott is the second largest.

== Description ==
Lunar sample 15555 is a coarse-grained, porphyritic rock with rounded olivine phenocrysts (1 mm) and subhedral zoned pyroxene phenocrysts (0.5–2 mm) set in a matrix of poikilitic plagioclase (up to 3 mm).

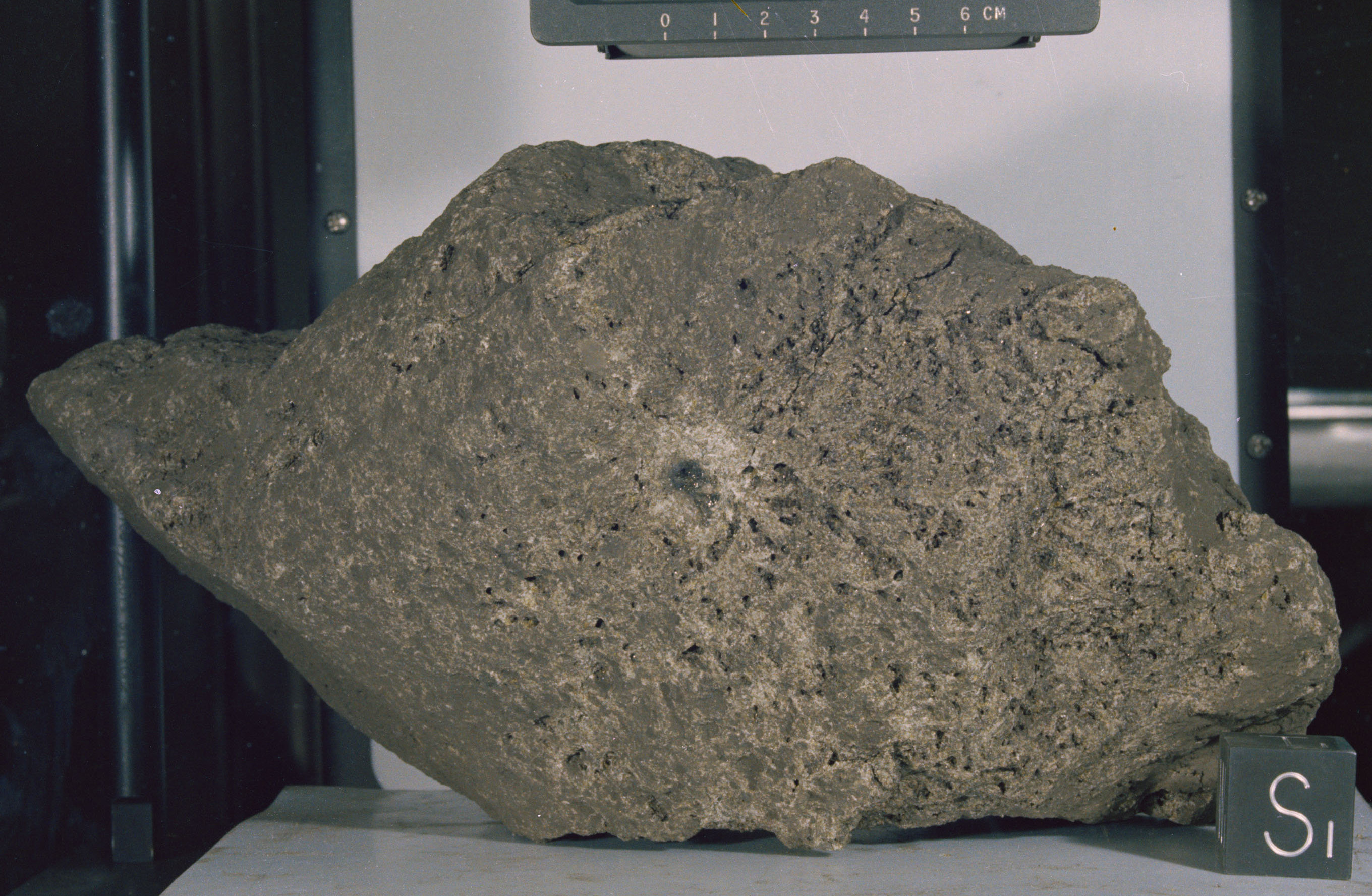
Great Scott in the Lunar Sample Laboratory Facility. The dark spot surrounded by a light halo in the center of the sample is a Micrometeoroid impact, or "zap pit."

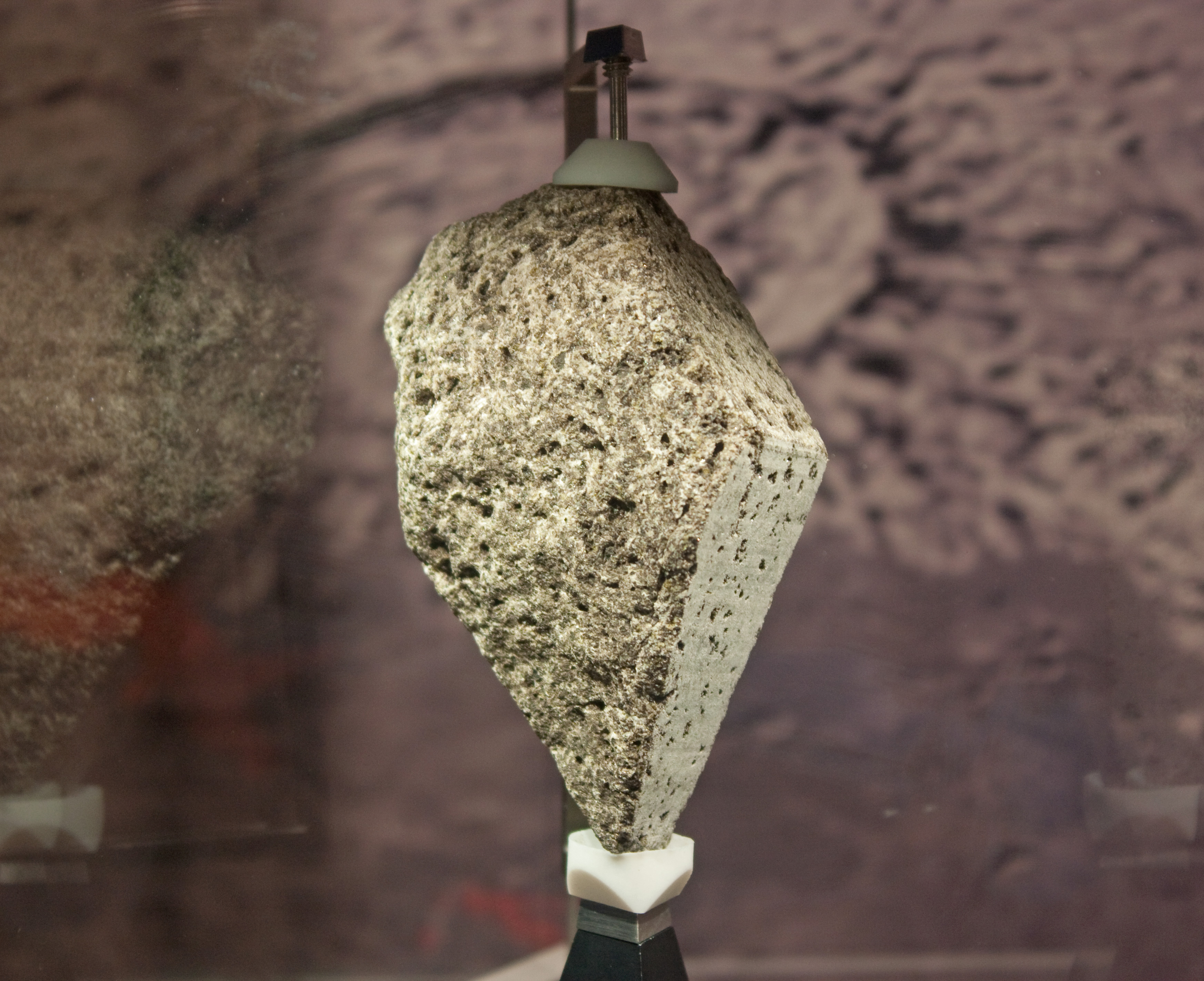
Cut fragment on display at the National Museum of Natural History

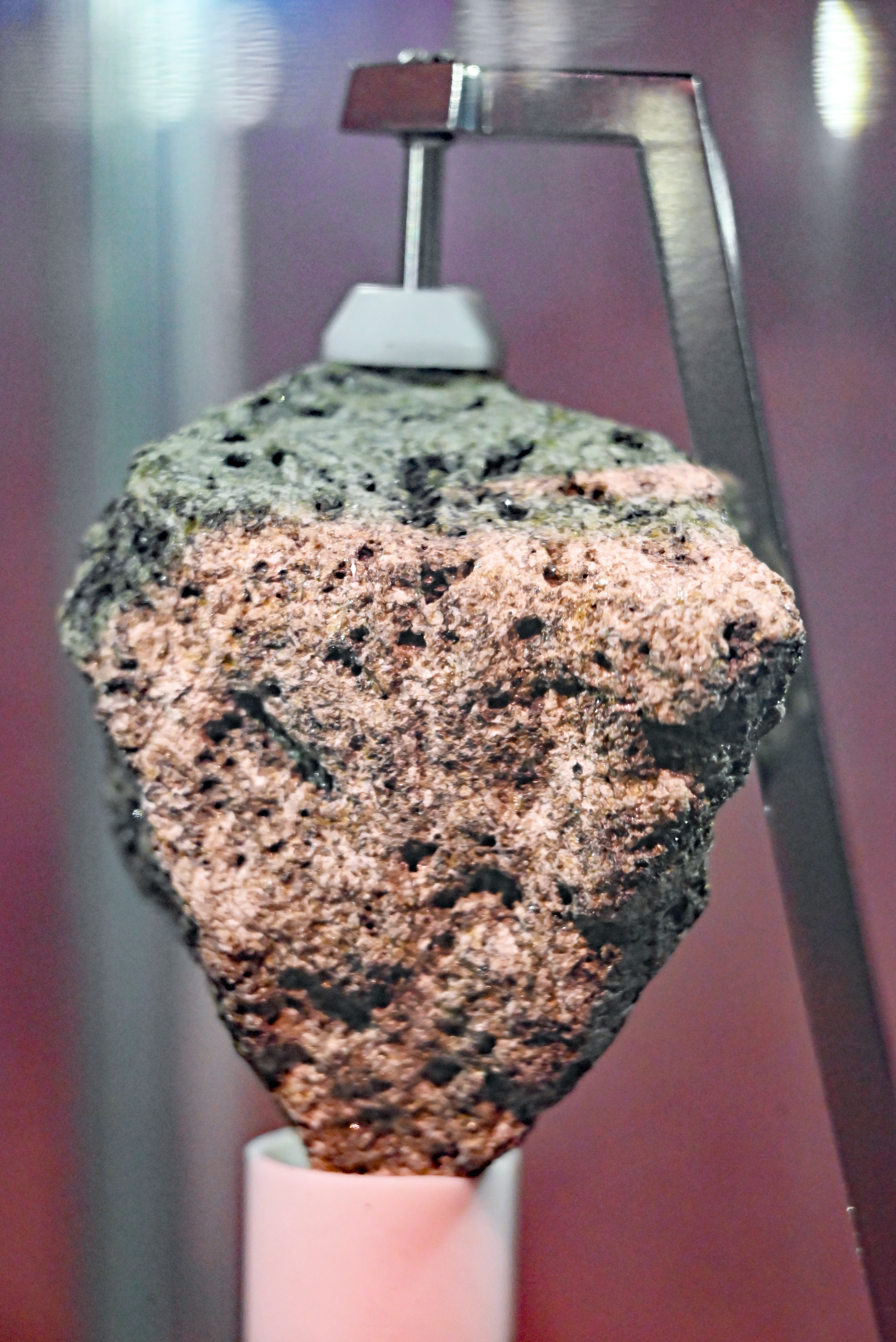
Fragment on display at the Tellus Science Museum, Cartersville, Georgia

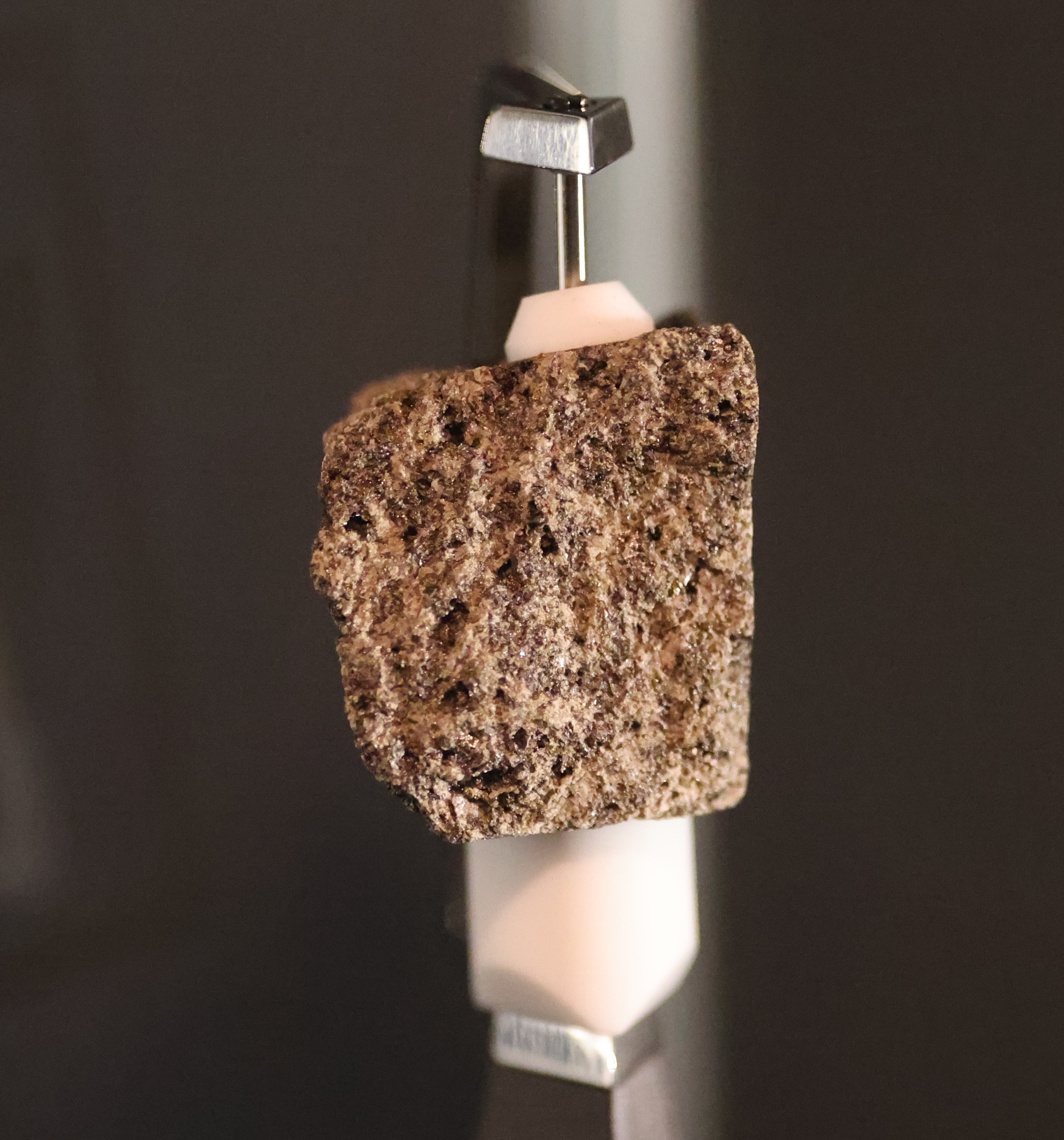
Fragment on display at the Science Museum, London

== See also ==
- Big Bertha
- Big Muley
- List of individual rocks
