= Big Bertha (lunar sample) =

First Moon rock of possible Earth origin, discovered by the crew of Apollo 14

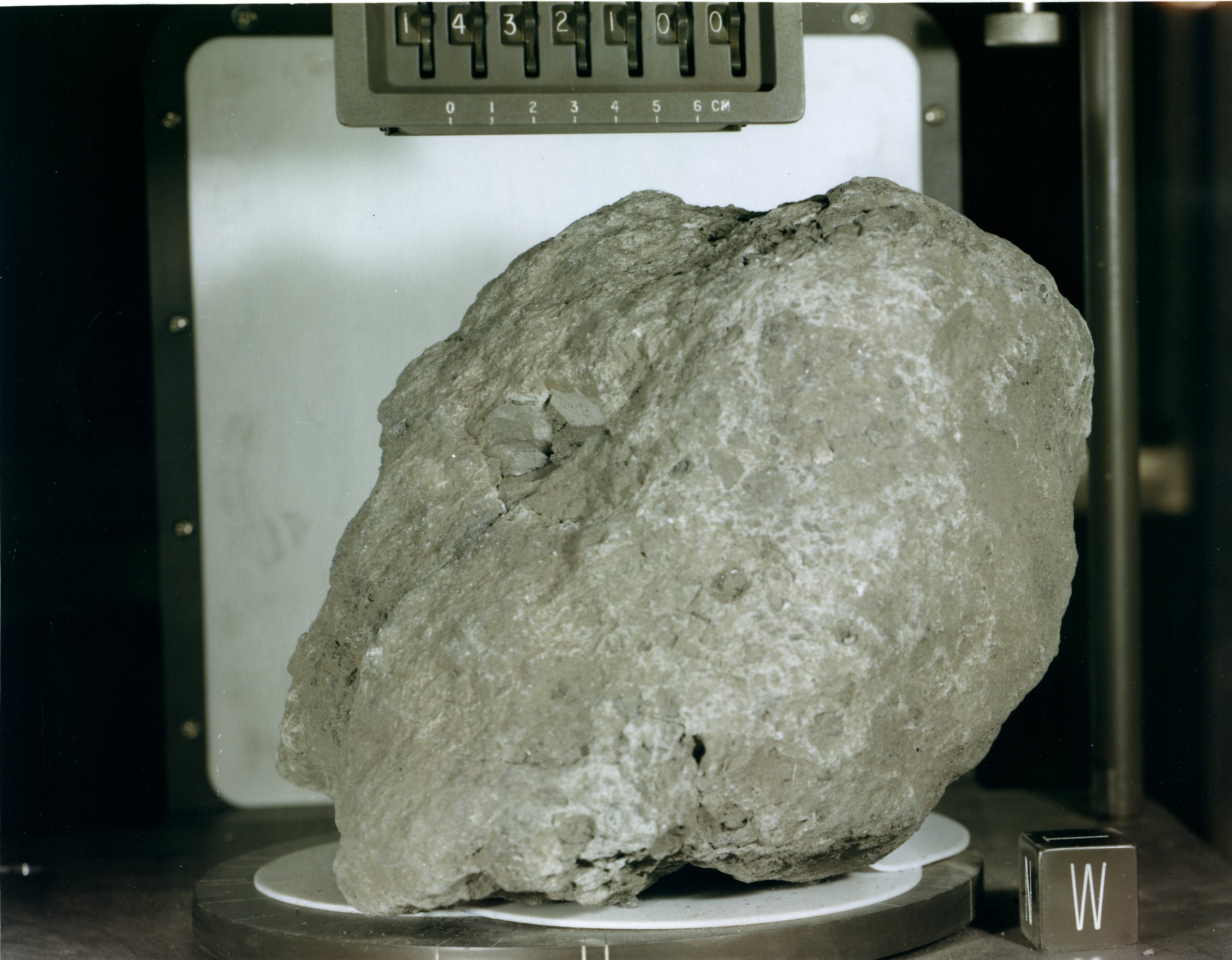
Big Bertha in the Lunar Sample Laboratory Facility.

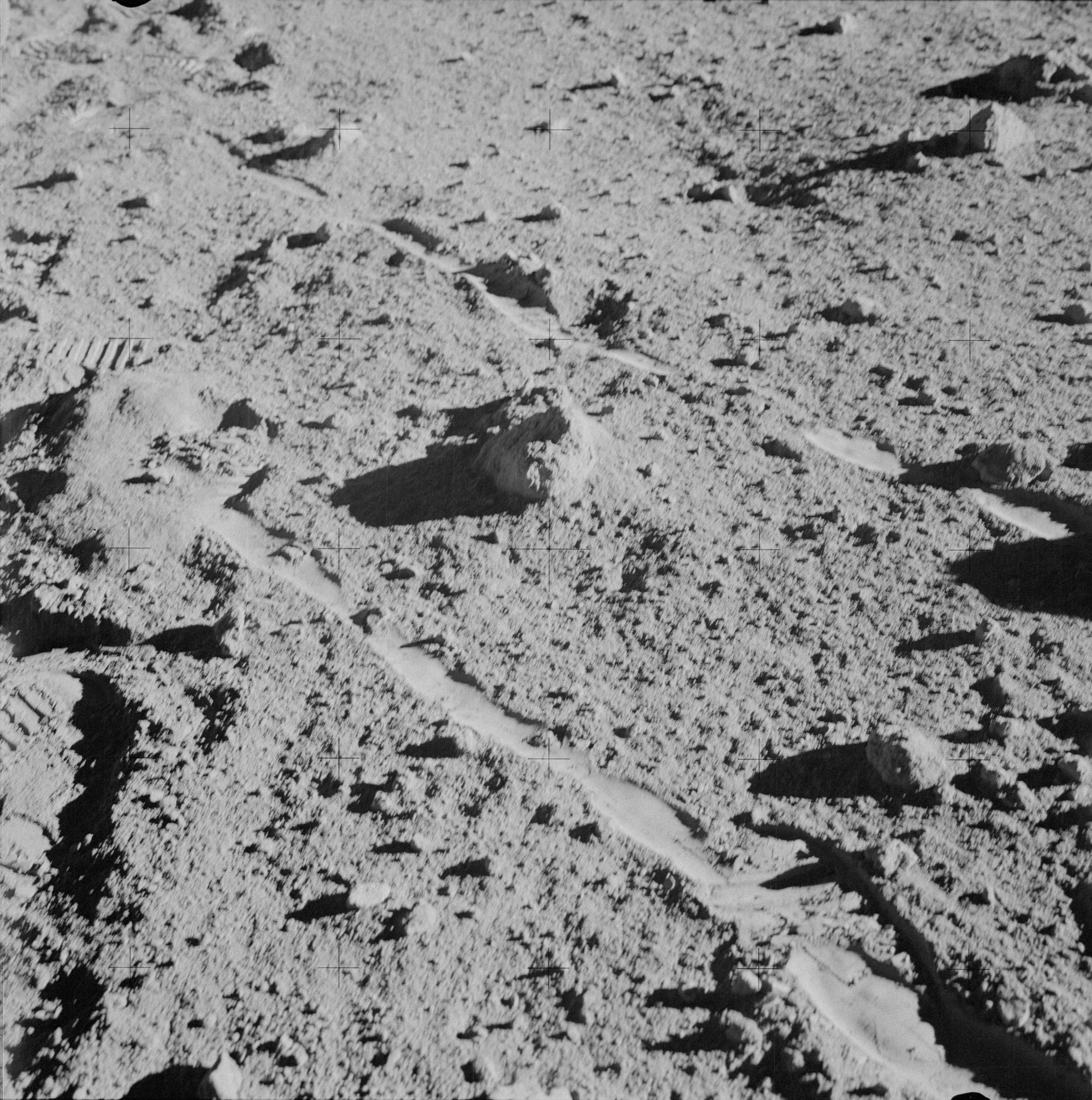
Big Bertha on the lunar surface prior to collection. It is above the exact center of the photo and lies between the wheel tracks made by the Modular Equipment Transporter (MET) or rickshaw-type portable workbench.

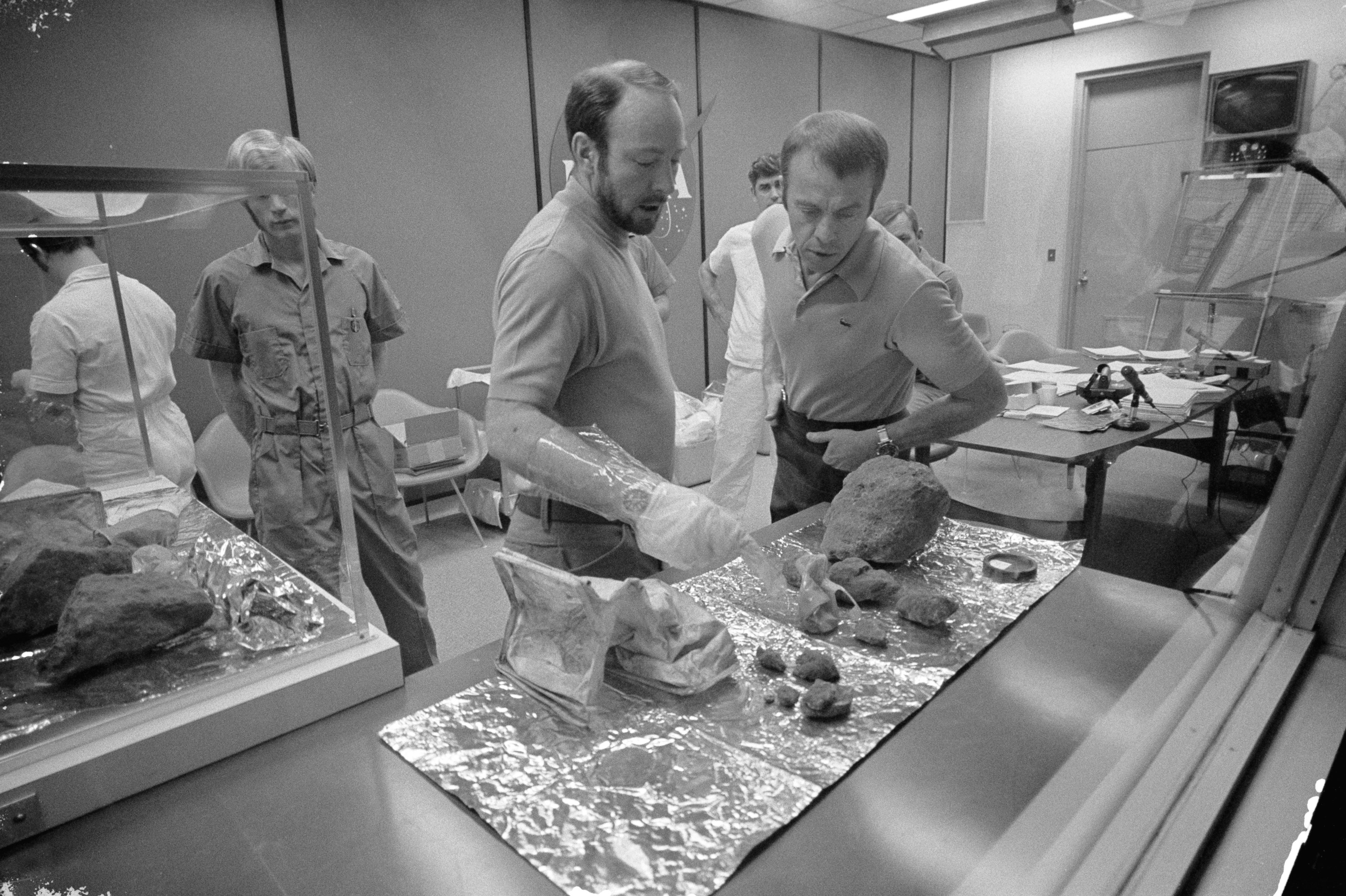
Apollo 14 astronauts Edgar Mitchell and Alan Shepard examine Big Bertha during a news conference at the Lunar Receiving Laboratory, Johnson Space Center.

Lunar Sample 14321, better known as "Big Bertha", is a lunar sample collected on the 1971 Apollo 14 mission. It was found in the Fra Mauro region of the Moon. At 8.998 kg (19.84 lb), this breccia rock is the third largest Moon sample returned during the Apollo program, behind Big Muley and Great Scott.

Big Bertha contains an embedded fragment of granite-like rock which may have been ejected from the Earth by a meteorite impact billions of years ago. If this origin were to be confirmed, that fragment would be the oldest known Earth rock. This claim has been disputed, however.

== Discovery ==
Big Bertha was named after the famous large World War I German howitzer Big Bertha because it was the largest rock returned from the Moon up to that time. It was collected by Apollo 14 commander Alan Shepard near the rim of Cone Crater, during the second EVA at station C1.

Transcript from the Apollo 14 Lunar Surface Journal:

[133:44:29] Mitchell: (Garbled) help with that one?

[133:44:30] Shepard: That's all right, I think I got it. There's a football-size rock, Houston, coming out of this area, which will not be bagged. It appears to be the prevalent rock of the boulders of the area. Got it?

[133:44:41] Mitchell: Got it.

== Earth rock ==
Like many rocks found on the surface of the Moon, Big Bertha is a breccia, an assemblage of smaller rock fragments (clasts) welded together by meteorite impacts. In January 2019, it was observed that one of the embedded fragments, about 2 cm wide and weighing about 1.8 g, consisted of felsite, a type of granite that is relatively rare on the Moon. Measurement of cerium and titanium ions in minute zircon grains and quartz crystals contained in that fragment were said to be inconsistent with a lunar origin, but consistent with a terrestrial origin.

The fragment could presumably have been ejected from the Earth by a large meteorite impact. The analysis of other trace elements in the zircon grains indicated that they formed about four billion years ago, during Earth's Hadean eon. If confirmed, that result would make the fragment the oldest known Earth rock and the first meteorite from Earth found in another celestial body.

The authors of the analysis noted that the Moon might be a better place to look for ancient Earth rocks than Earth itself, as material erodes much slower on the Moon's surface than it does on Earth, and that other such fragments may be embedded in Apollo samples.

However, a more recent study disputes the terrestrial origin claim, observing that measurement of other trace elements (including gallium, germanium, zinc, barium and tantalum) in those zircon inclusions deviate significantly from those typically found in terrestrial granite rocks, and suggest instead a lunar origin.

== See also ==
- Big Muley
- Bench Crater meteorite
- Hadean zircon
- List of individual rocks
