= Big Muley =

Largest lunar rock collected during the Apollo program

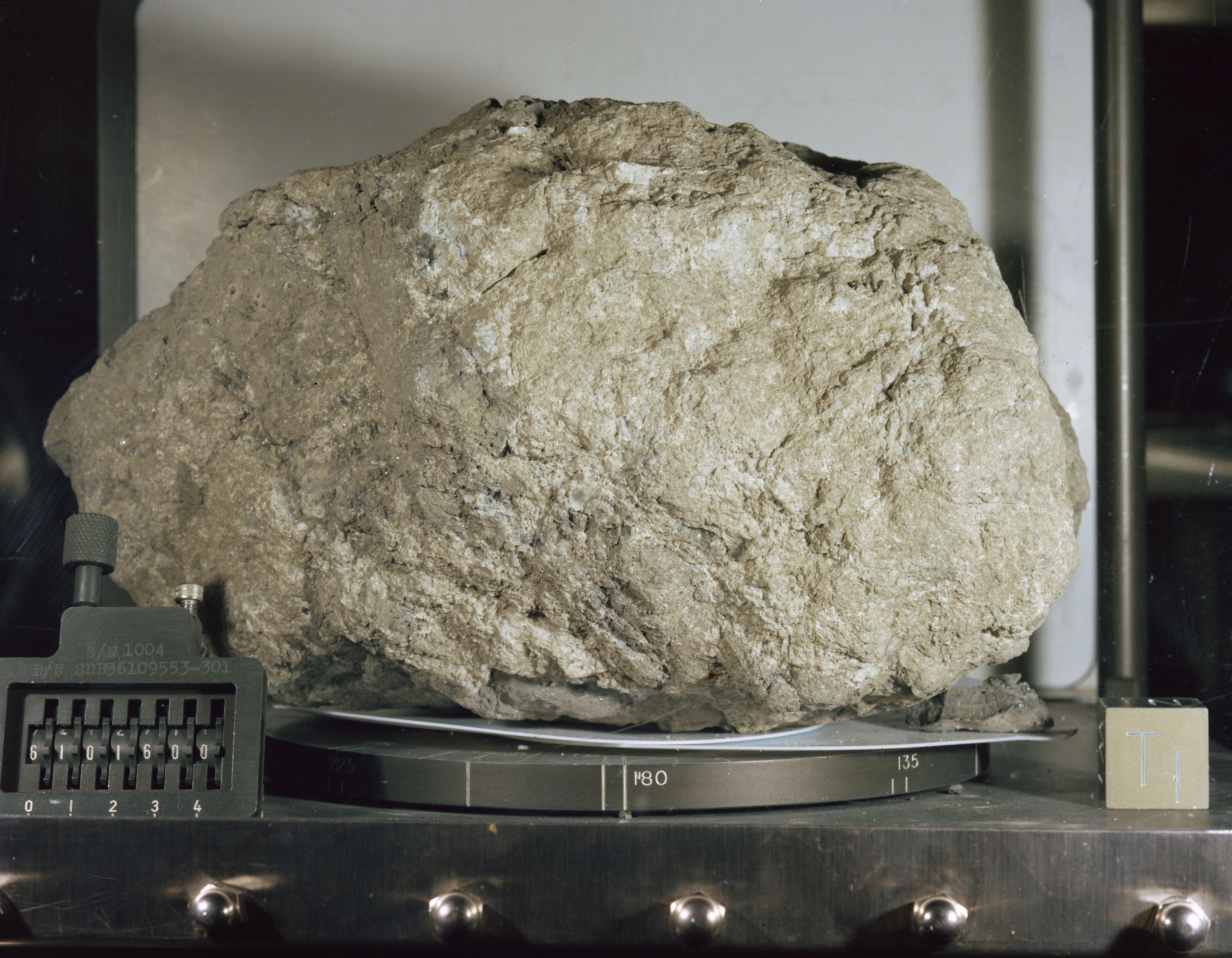
NASA photo of sample 61016, better known as "Big Muley"

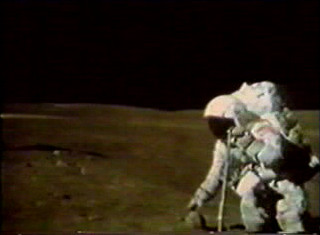
TV camera still showing Charlie Duke about to pick up Big Muley on the rim of Plum crater

Lunar Sample 61016, better known as "Big Muley", is a lunar sample discovered and collected on the Apollo 16 mission in 1972 in the Descartes Highlands, on the rim of Plum crater, near Flag crater (Station 1). It is the largest sample returned from the Moon as part of the Apollo program. The rock, an 11.7 kg (26 lb) breccia consisting mainly of shocked anorthosite attached to a fragment of troctolitic "melt rock", is named after Bill Muehlberger, the Apollo 16 field geology team leader.

Big Muley is currently stored at the Lunar Sample Laboratory Facility at the Lyndon B. Johnson Space Center.

== Discovery ==
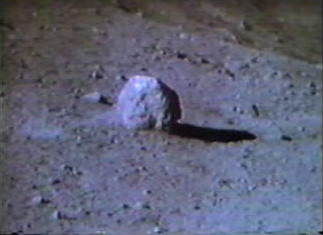
TV camera still of Big Muley prior to collection

Big Muley was discovered on the eastern rim of Plum crater (Station 1) in the Descartes highlands of the Moon. Astronaut Charlie Duke said as he was picking up the sample, "If I fall into Plum crater getting this rock, Muehlberger has had it." In a 1996 letter and a 1997 e-mail message, Bill Muehlberger said:

Big Muley was a problem from the moment we saw it on TV (from the TV camera on the LRV). The crew had been told to pick up nothing larger than their fist – the lab types could analyze remarkably small pieces and get reproducible results. So, when we spotted Big Muley with the television camera and saw what looked like a large rectangle flashing at us, we jumped to the conclusion that it was a crystal – or cleavage – face of plagioclase feldspar. That made the rock an anorthosite which, according to our pre-mission interpretations, should not be present at this landing site. Further, there was a small crater on our side (between the Rover and Big Muley) that we thought could be a bounce crater caused by this rock on landing. The direction suggested that this could have been from Theophilus, a large, relatively young crater that had been proposed as a source for some material that might be scattered across the landing area. So, I put in a request for the crew to pick it up as they returned to the LRV. We had no idea of size – it was the first sampling stop on the mission – but, once the crew got close, we realized that it was bigger than the max size suggested for return from the Moon and then Charlie started complaining about it(s size) and about his struggle to pick it up. It turned out to be the largest rock returned from the Moon! And it turned out to be a useful rock for the researchers.

== Description ==
Big Muley is a 11.7 kg (26 lb) breccia, consisting mainly of shocked anorthosite attached to a fragment of troctolitic "melt rock".

The rock's cosmic ray exposure age was discovered to be about 1.8 million years, linking it to ejecta, or debris, from the impact that formed South Ray crater, to the south of the Apollo 16 landing site. Big Muley's age has been estimated since 1980 to be approximately 3.97 ± 0.25 billion years. The rock was highly shocked at some point in its history, as indicated by the fact that most of the rock's plagioclase content was converted to maskelynite and/or plagioclase glass.

== See also ==
- Great Scott
- Big Bertha
- List of individual rocks
