= William R. Muehlberger =

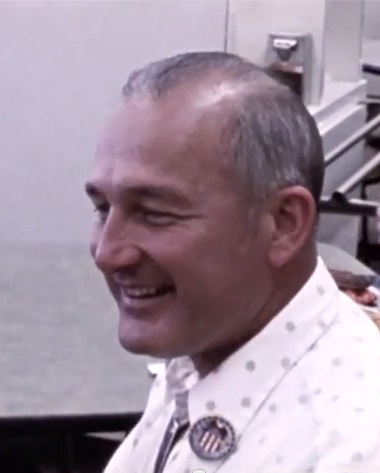
- Muehlberger in 1972 during the Apollo 16 landing
- Born: William Rudolf Muehlberger; September 26, 1923; New York, New York, United States
- Died: September 14, 2011 (aged 87)
- Education: Ph.D., Structural Geology (1954)
- Alma mater: California Institute of Technology (Caltech)
- Occupation: Geology professor
- Years active: 1954 to 1992
- Employer: University of Texas at Austin (emeritus)
- Known for: Training of Apollo astronauts, North American Structural Geology
- Spouse: Sally J. Provine

Signature
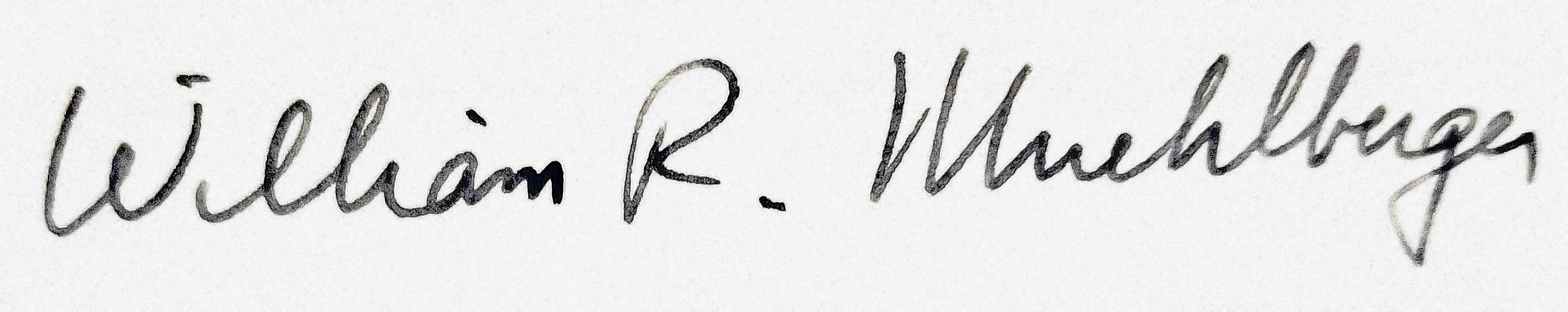

William Rudolf "Bill" Muehlberger (September 26, 1923 – September 14, 2011), Professor of Geology at University of Texas at Austin, was the geology principal investigator of both the Apollo 16 and 17 missions to the Moon, for National Aeronautics and Space Administration (NASA). He died of natural causes on September 14, 2011.

The Apollo 16 Moon rock Big Muley is named after Muehlberger.

== See also ==
- Capulin Volcano National Monument
- Kilauea
- Lunar Crater National Natural Landmark
- Mono-Inyo Craters
- Rio Grande Gorge
- Stillwater igneous complex
- Sudbury Basin
