= Descartes Highlands =

Highlands on Earth's Moon

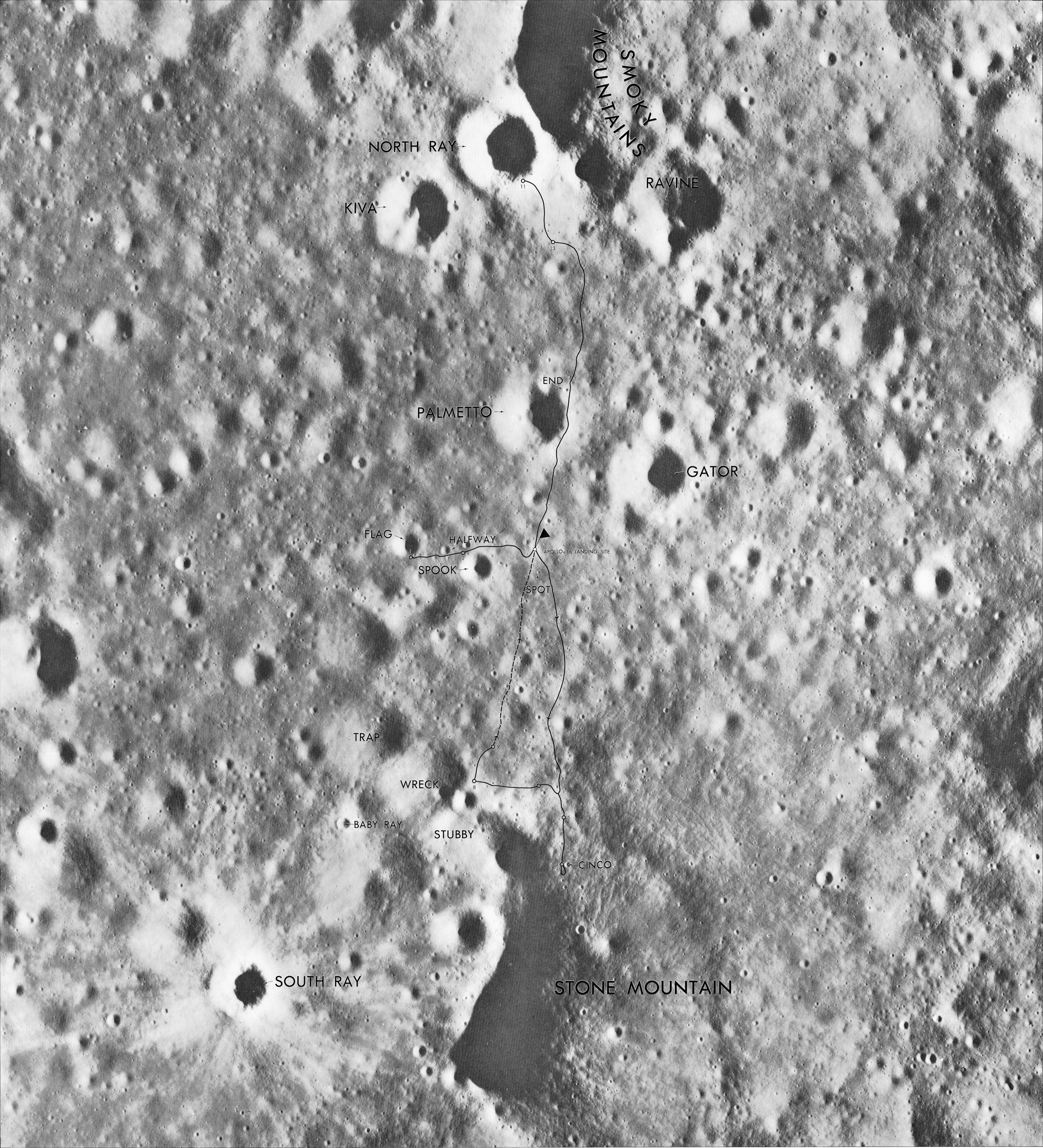
Aerial photo of the Descartes Highlands with features and Apollo 16 mission traverses labeled.

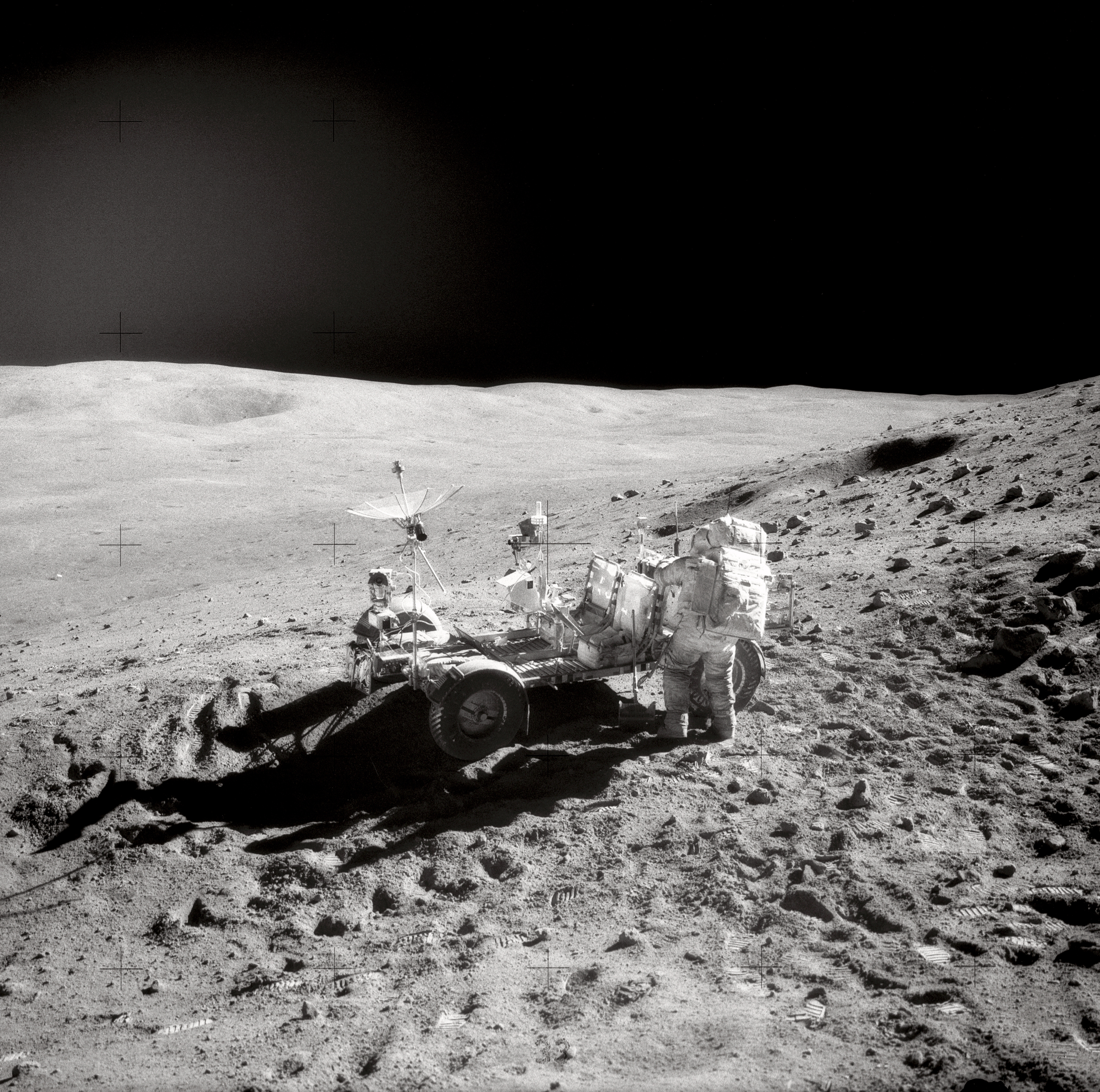
Apollo 16 view from the side of Stone Mountain, looking across the valley between Stone Mountain and the Smoky Mountains (towards the north from Station 4/Cinco Crater in the aerial photo above). Ravine Crater, labeled in the northern portion of the photo above, is visible here at upper left.

The Descartes Highlands is an area of lunar highlands located on the near side that served as the landing site of the American Apollo 16 mission in early 1972. The Descartes Highlands is located in the area surrounding Descartes crater, after which the feature received its name.

== Geology ==
Two major formations dominate the Descartes Highlands area: the Cayley Formation and the Descartes Formation. The latter is composed primarily of highland plateau material, perhaps debris from large impact events—specifically the impact that formed Mare Nectaris. North Ray and South Ray craters, the former sampled directly by the Apollo 16 crew, revealed a layering sequence, possibly an overlap of the Cayley and Descartes formations.

The area of the Descartes Highlands is characterized by an undulating landscape covered with old and some new, sharp rimmed craters. Based upon findings during the Apollo 16 mission, some of the floors of these craters were covered with glass similar to that found at the Taurus-Littrow landing site on Apollo 17. According to Apollo 16 commander John Young, the arrangement of the glass gave it the appearance of dried mud.

Before Apollo 16 sampled the Descartes Highlands, it was believed that volcanic material would be abundant in the area after visual analysis of the features there. It was thought that the formations in the area were formed by lavas more viscous than the lavas that formed the Lunar mare. This was later disproved after the analysis of samples from the area. It was revealed that many of the rocks in the area are not volcanic in origin, but breccias composed of fragments from several lunar impacts. Astronauts Young and Duke visited Sudbury, Ontario, Canada in July 1971 to examine shatter cones. Sudbury is a site of a large meteor impact exhibiting substantial evidence of shatter cone geology. In the Descartes Highlands, it was determined that the region's topography was formed by meteor impact instead of volcanic activity.

== Landing site selection ==
All of the preceding Apollo landing missions sampled Lunar mare material, either directly or indirectly. A landing site in the Lunar highlands was to be selected with the goal of investigating the material located there. Two landing sites were given consideration to achieve this goal: the Descartes site and the crater Alphonsus.

The Descartes Highlands was selected for the Apollo 16 mission in order to enable astronauts John Young and Charles Duke to sample the prominent Descartes and Cayley formations concentrated in the area. Sampling these formations was a priority, as the two cover much of the near side of the Moon. Priority was also given to locating and obtaining samples of old highland material that was older than the Imbrium impact in order to give insight to the geologic timeline and composition of the Moon. North Ray and South Ray craters, both prominent features in the immediate landing area, were also prioritized because material from the prominent formations in the area had been naturally excavated there by the impacts that formed them.

== See also ==
- Apollo 16
- Big Muley
- Geology of the Moon
- Descartes (crater)
