= Cayley Formation =

The Cayley Formation is a discontinuous unit of plains-forming material on the Moon. It was first recognized in the central near side of the Moon in 1965, by the Astrogeology group of the United States Geological Survey. It was previously mapped as part of the Fra Mauro formation. During the Apollo era, the formation was mapped in many other parts of the Moon including the far side (e.g., Mendeleev basin.)

The description of the formation from the 1967 edition of the Geologic Map of Julius Caesar Quadrangle (LAC-60) of the Moon follows:

Surface generally flat and smooth. Apparently lacks ridges and rilles. Appears to mantle subjacent terrain; buried (or ghost) craters evident in some areas (3° 30' N., 14° 40' E.). Albedo intermediate, about the same as that of the Fra Mauro Formation, higher than Procellarum Group. Crater density greater than on the Procellarum Group. Type area is east of the unrelated crater Cayley for which the formation is named; 3 1/2°-4 1/2° N., 15 1/2°-16 1/4° E.

The formation was interpreted as:

Volcanic materials; may be ash-flow or ash-fall tuff with intercalated ballistically deposited layers.

In the Cayley Formation near Cayley crater, the formation overlies Imbrium sculpture but is embayed by mare material and has a higher crater density than nearby maria. Thus, the Cayley Formation predates the mare but postdates sculpturing by the Imbrian event.

One of the main objectives of the Apollo 16 mission to the Moon in 1972 was to obtain samples of the Cayley Formation, and also the adjacent Descartes Formation. Most scientists predicted that volcanic rocks would be obtained from the Cayley Formation, but the astronauts (Charles Duke and John Young) found almost nothing but breccias. The Cayley Formation was heavily sampled at Flag, Spook, and North Ray craters, as well as at the Lunar Module (LM) Orion and geology stations southwest of the LM.

The lack of volcanic rocks returned from the Cayley forced a reinterpretation of its origin. The Cayley was reinterpreted to be a fluidized ejecta deposit resulting from the formation of the Imbrium basin or of the Orientale basin, which occurred after the Imbrium basin-forming event.

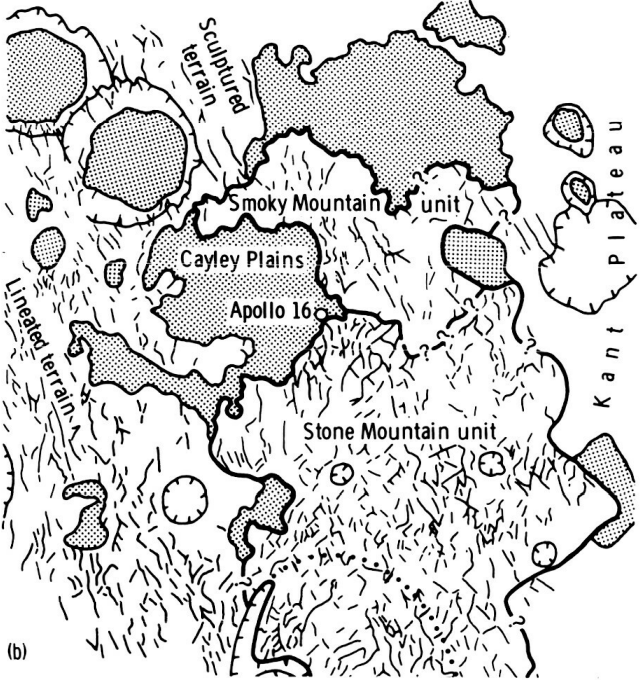
The Descartes highlands region, with the Apollo 16 landing point near center. Furrows and approximate outline of the two units of the Descartes highlands are indicated. Plains of the Cayley Formation are shaded; craters are shown by hachures. Northwest-southeast trend of the furrows on the western side of the map area is radial to the Imbrium Basin.

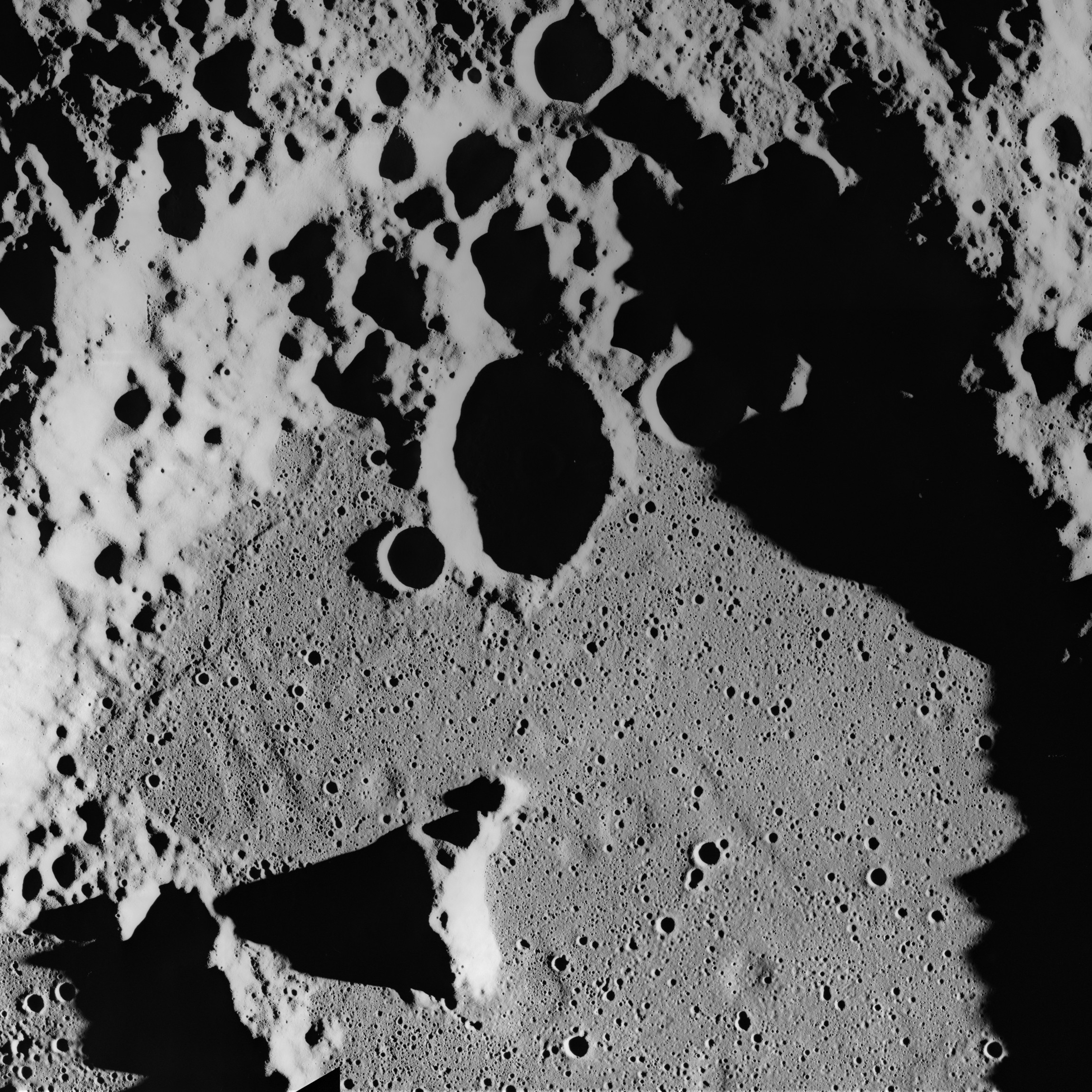
Ghost craters on the surface of the Cayley Formation in the bottom of Albategnius crater. Albategnius B crater (above center) is approximately 15 km across. Subdued troughs trending north-northwest may be buried Imbrium sculpture. The Cayley Formation may be mantling fresh craters to produce a subdued flatbottomed bowl shape.

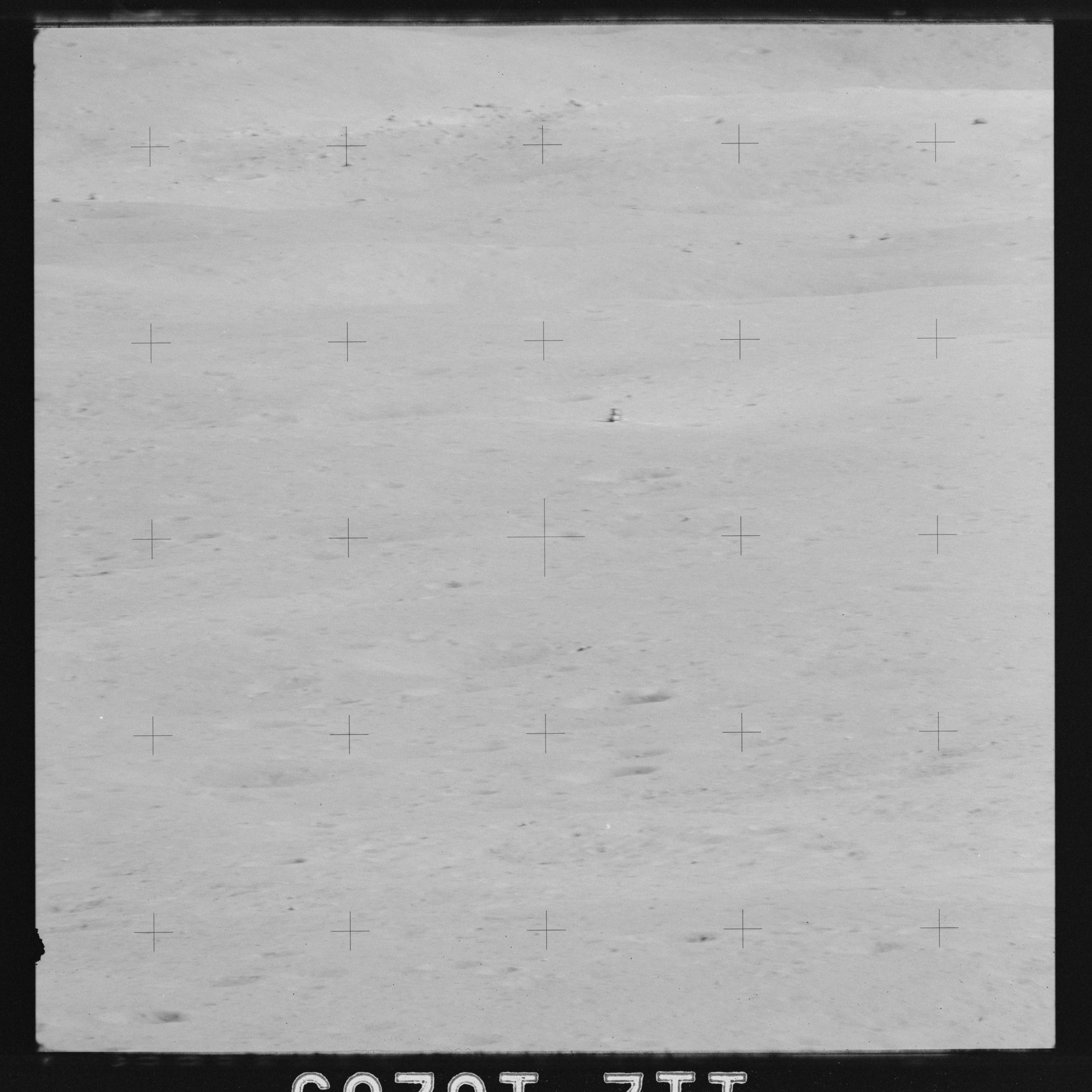
View of the lunar surface representing the Cayley Formation around the Lunar Module Orion, taken from Station 4 on Stone Mountain south of the landing point.
