= South Ray (crater) =

Crater on the Moon

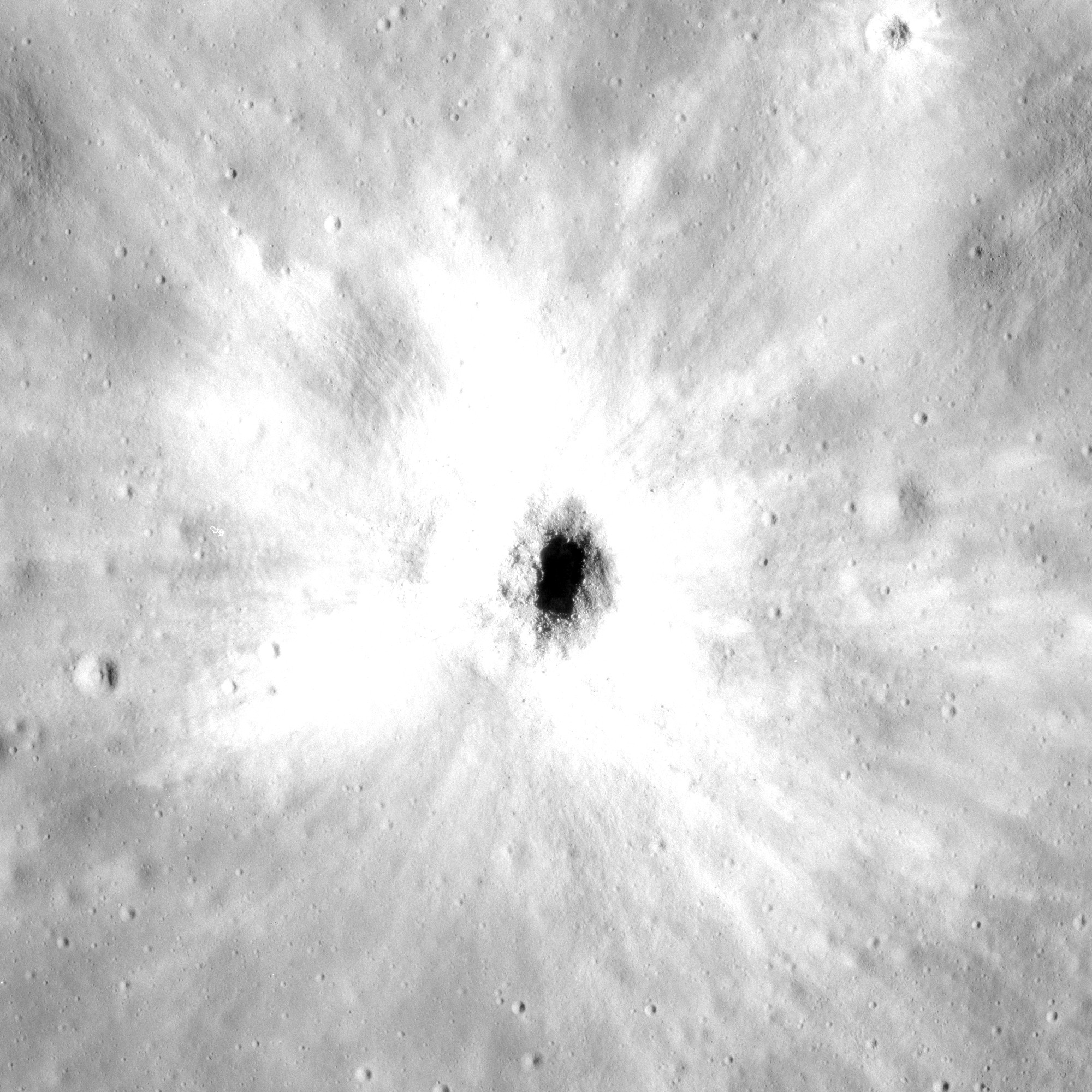
- Apollo 16 image. Baby Ray is in upper right.
- Coordinates: 9.15°S 15.38°E
- Diameter: 700 m
- Depth: 143 m
- Formation: Copernican
- Eponym: Astronaut-named feature

South Ray crater is a small crater in the Descartes Highlands of the Moon photographed from the lunar surface by the astronauts of Apollo 16. The name of the crater was formally adopted by the IAU in 1973.

The Apollo 16 Lunar Module (LM) Orion landed between North Ray and South Ray craters on April 21, 1972. The astronauts John Young and Charles Duke explored the area between the craters over the course of three EVAs using a Lunar Roving Vehicle, or rover. They came closest to South Ray on EVA 2, at station 4 (Cinco crater), about 3.9 km south of the landing site. Duke photographed South Ray from there with a 500-mm lens.

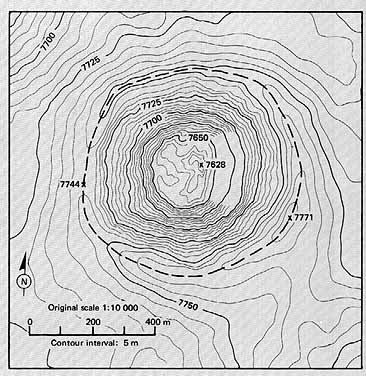
Topographic map of South Ray based on processing of Apollo 16 panoramic camera images. The dashed line indicates the crater rim.

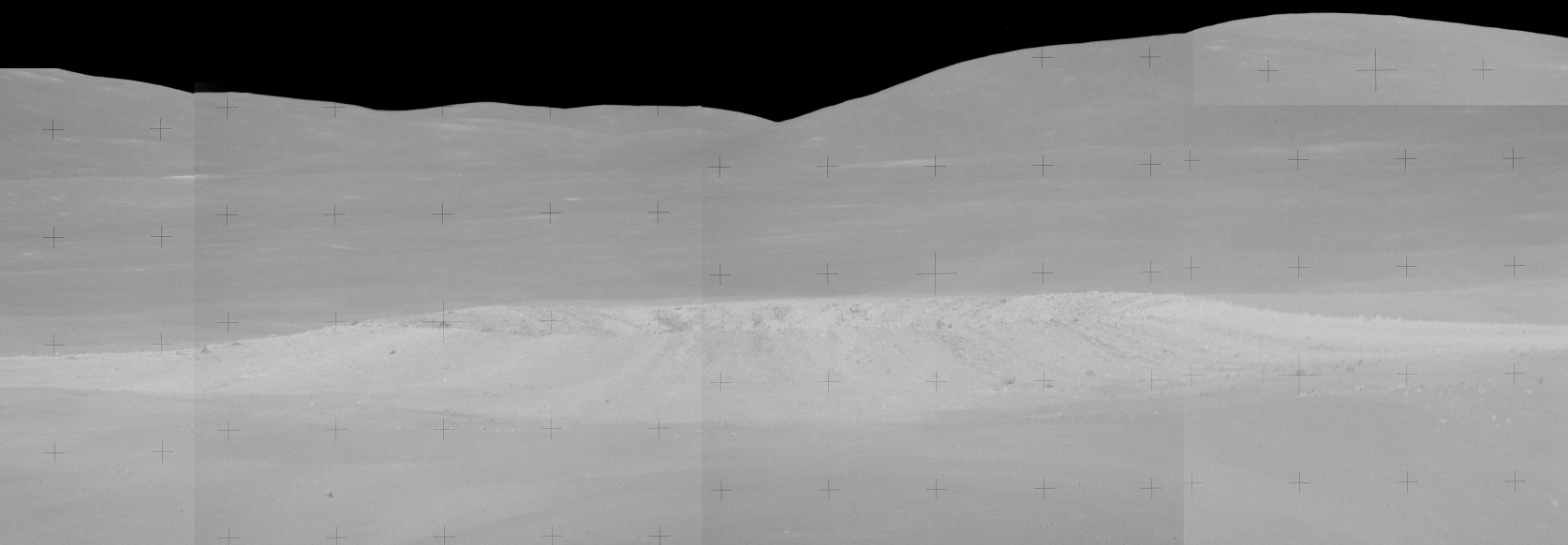
Panorama of South Ray crater from Station 4 (Cinco crater) on Stone Mountain, facing southwest. Charlie Duke said as he was taking the photos of this panorama, "I can see into the rim on the inner wall on the south side. And the characteristics of the thing: it's got black streaks and white streaks coming out of the wall right over the rim, which says to me, there's two types of rocks down there."

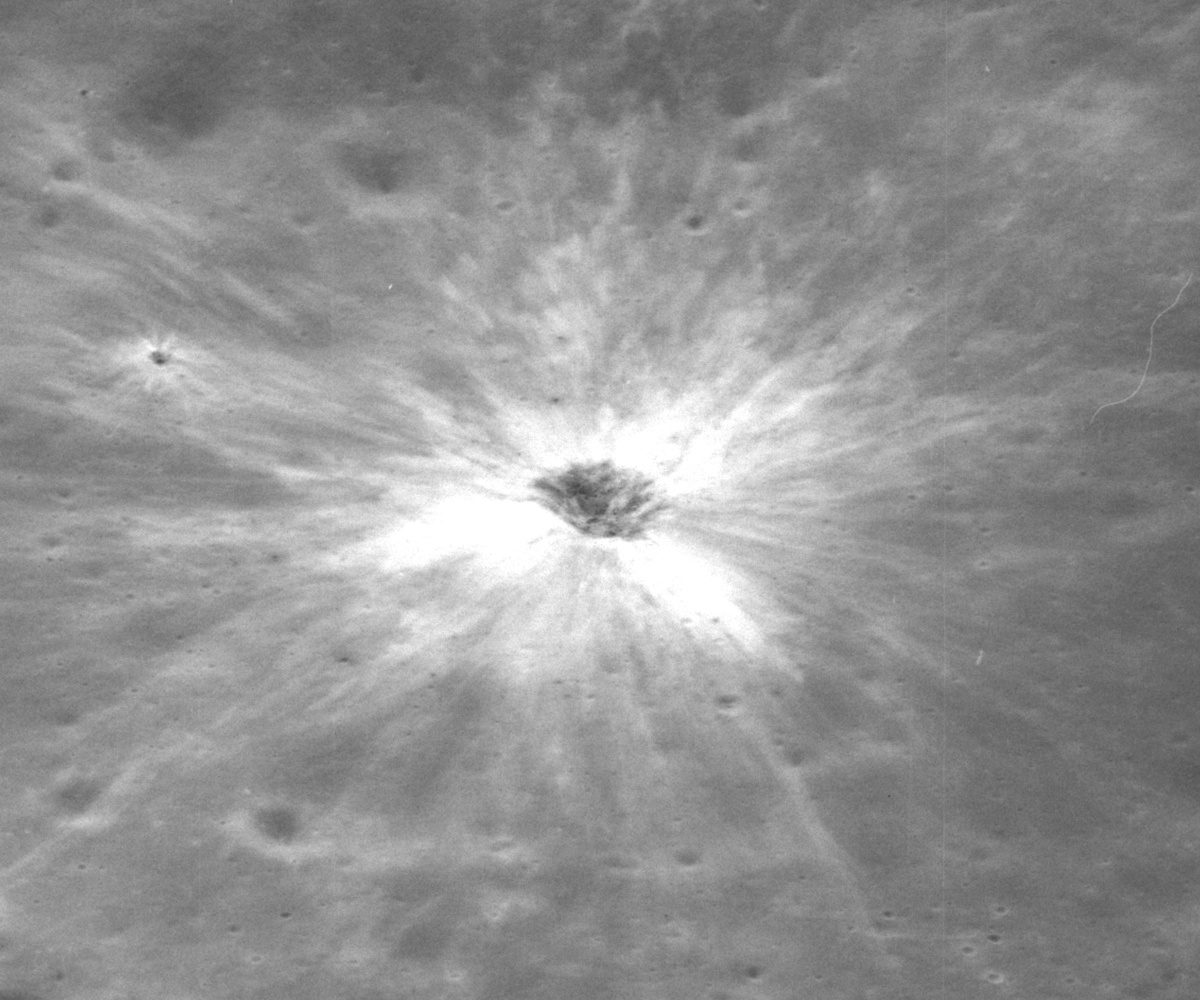
Oblique Apollo 14 image, facing east

South Ray crater is approximately 700 m in diameter and approximately 120 m deep, with a bright system of rays of ejecta. The astronauts observed that the ejecta of South Ray was very bouldery, and reported that it would have been difficult or impossible to drive there on their rover.

South Ray cuts into the Cayley Formation of Imbrian age. The crater itself is much younger (Copernican).
