= Lunar Receiving Laboratory =

Laboratory at the Johnson Space Center

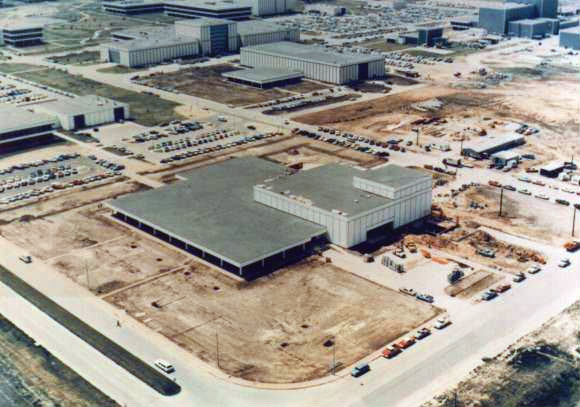
The Lunar Receiving Laboratory shortly after it was built.

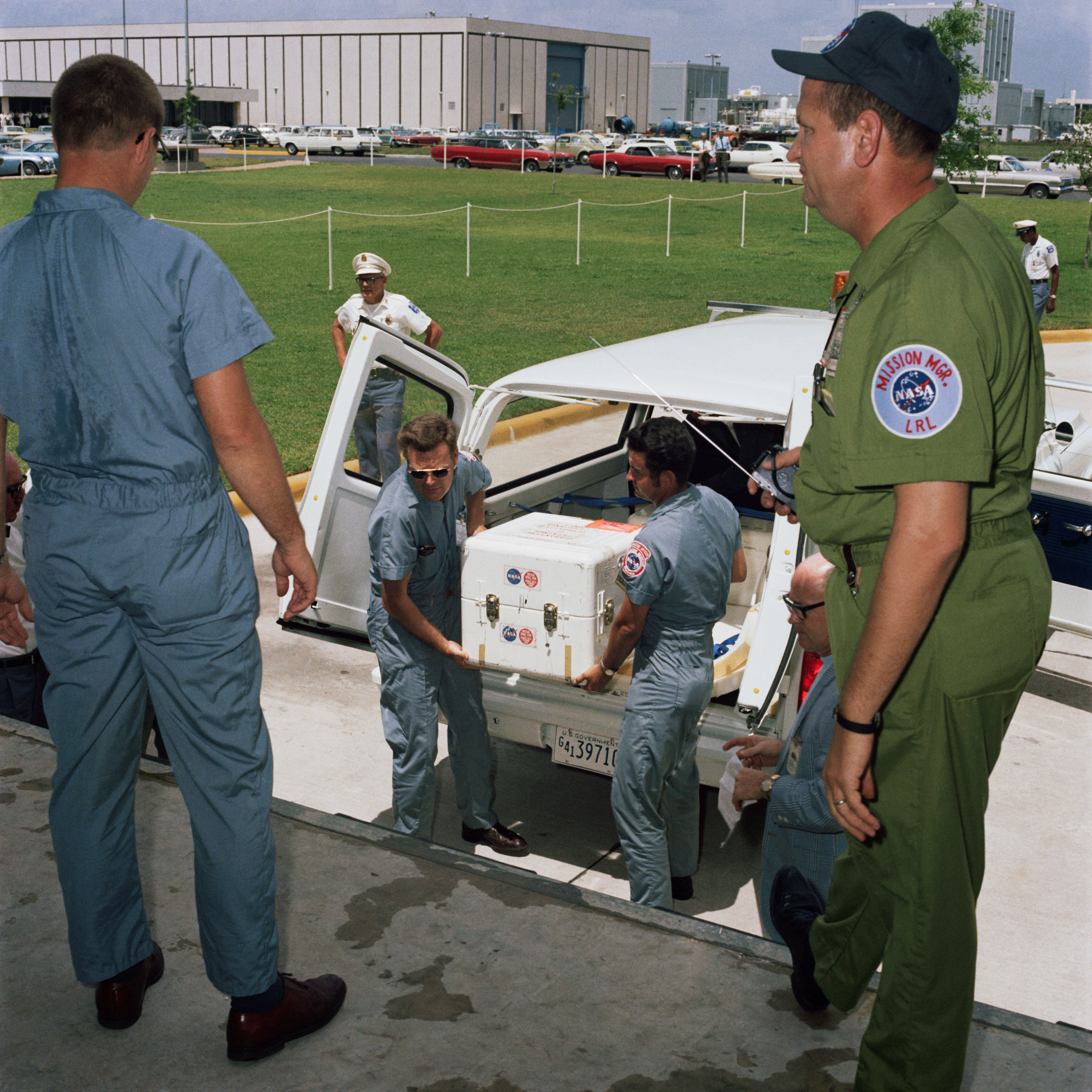
First samples from the Moon being delivered to LRL in 1969

The Lunar Receiving Laboratory (LRL) was a facility at NASA's Lyndon B. Johnson Space Center (Building 37) that was constructed to quarantine astronauts and material brought back from the Moon during the Apollo program to reduce the risk of back-contamination. After recovery at sea, crews from Apollo 11, Apollo 12, and Apollo 14 walked from their helicopter to the Mobile Quarantine Facility on the deck of an aircraft carrier and were brought to the LRL for quarantine. Samples of rock and regolith that the astronauts collected and brought back were flown directly to the LRL and initially analyzed in glovebox vacuum chambers.

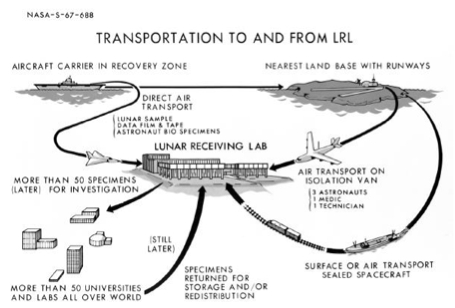

The quarantine requirement was dropped for Apollo 15 and later missions. The LRL was used for study, distribution, and safe storage of the lunar samples. Between 1969 and 1972, six Apollo space flight missions brought back 382 kilograms (842 pounds) of lunar rocks, core samples, pebbles, sand, and dust from the lunar surface—in all, 2,200 samples from six exploration sites. Other lunar samples were returned to Earth by three automated Soviet spacecraft, Luna 16 in 1970, Luna 20 in 1972, and Luna 24 in 1976, which returned samples totaling 300 grams (about 3/4 pound).

In 1976, some of the samples were moved to Brooks Air Force Base in San Antonio, Texas, for second-site storage. In 1979, a Lunar Sample Laboratory Facility was built to serve as the chief repository for the Apollo samples: permanent storage in a physically secure and non-contaminating environment. The facility includes vaults for the samples and records, and laboratories for sample preparation and study. The Lunar Receiving Laboratory building was later occupied by NASA's Life Sciences division, contained biomedical and environment labs, and was used for experiments involving human adaptation to microgravity.

In September 2019, NASA announced that the Lunar Receiving Laboratory had not been used for two years and would be demolished.

== See also ==
- Moon rock
- Lunar Sample Laboratory Facility
