= North Ray (crater) =

Crater on the Moon

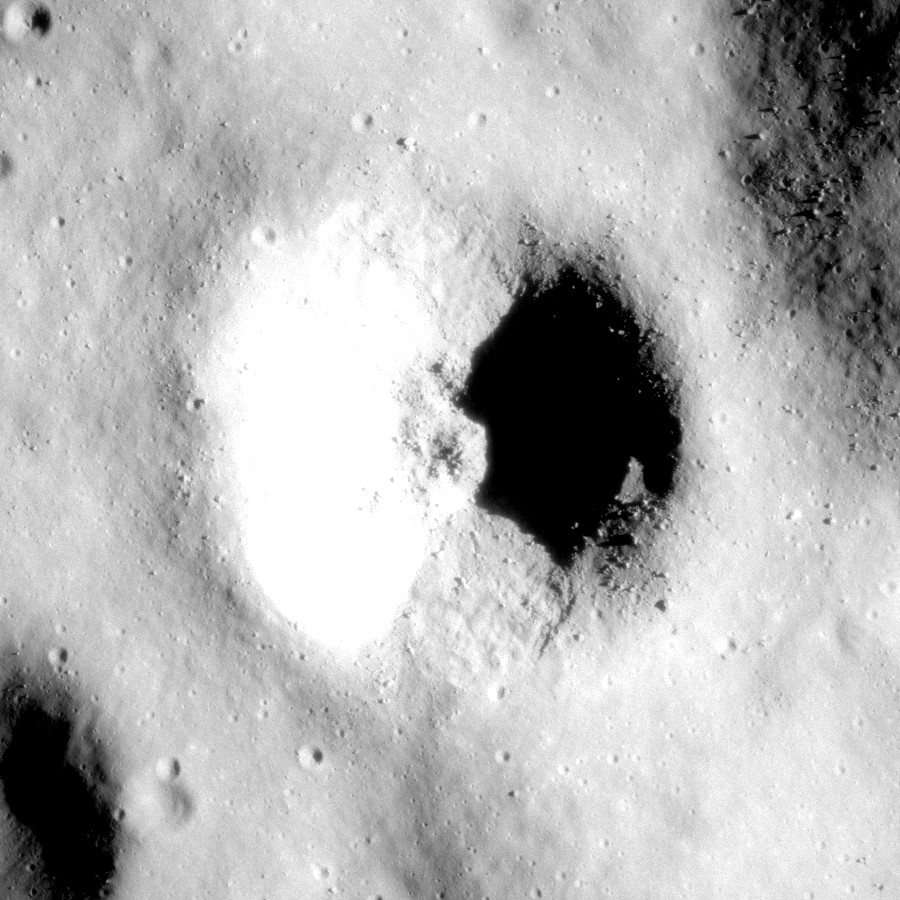
- Apollo 16 image
- Coordinates: 8.82°S 15.48°E
- Diameter: 950 m
- Depth: 240 m
- Formation: Copernican
- Eponym: Astronaut-named feature

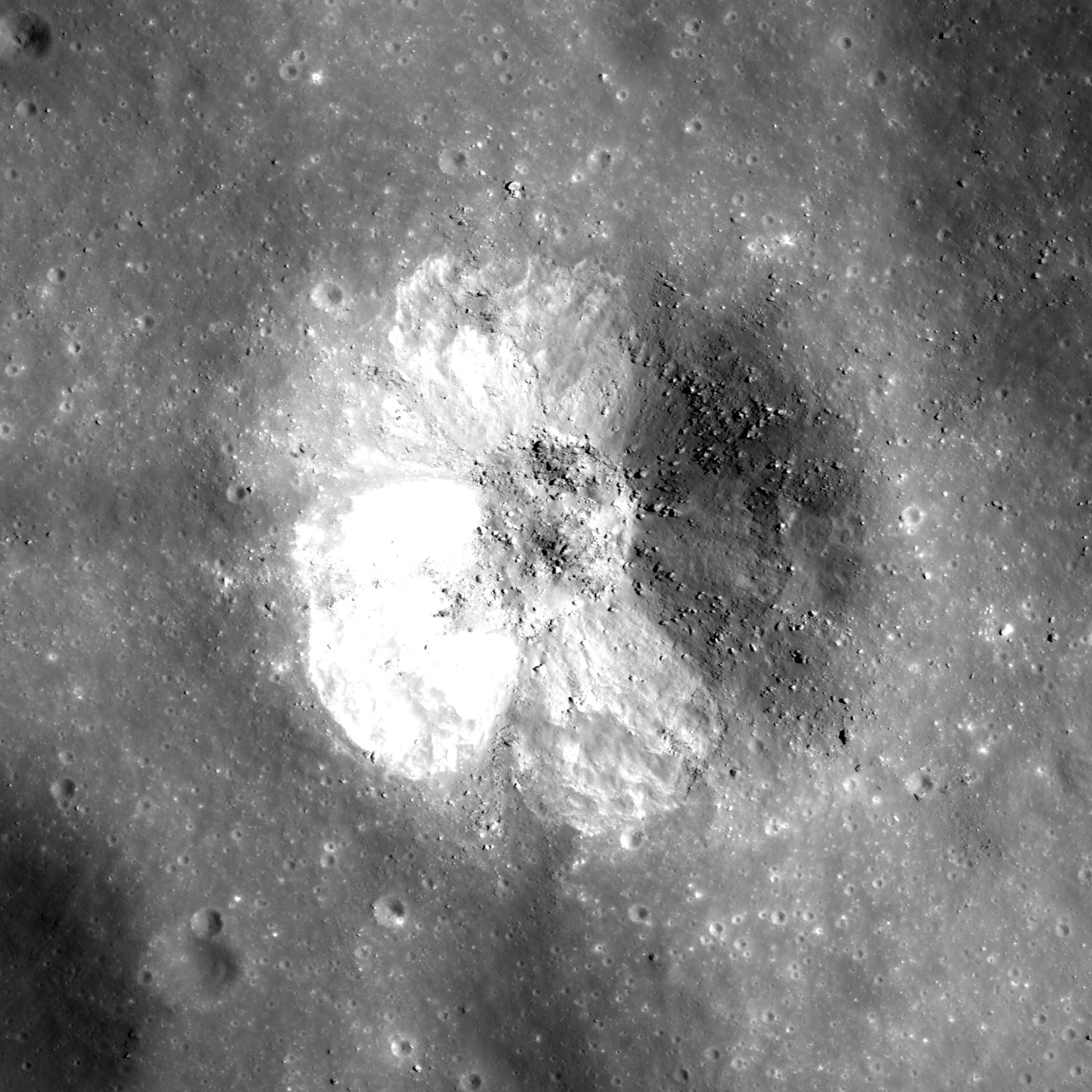
LRO image

North Ray crater is a small crater in the Descartes Highlands of the Moon visited by the astronauts of Apollo 16. The name of the crater was formally adopted by the IAU in 1973. It is the largest crater sampled by astronauts during the Apollo program.

The Apollo 16 Lunar Module (LM) Orion landed between North Ray and South Ray craters on April 21, 1972. The astronauts John Young and Charles Duke explored the area between the craters over the course of three EVAs using a Lunar Roving Vehicle, or rover. They visited North Ray on EVA 3, at station 11, about 4.4 km north of the landing site. On the way, they drove along the rim of the similar sized but older crater Palmetto, which is approximately 3 km south of North Ray.

North Ray crater is approximately 1 km in diameter and approximately 240 m deep. The astronauts observed that the upper 50 m of the slope is gentle, but that it becomes steep below 50 m, and they could not observe the bottom. The inner slopes are covered by boulders up to 5 m across. A huge (10 m high x 20 m long) boulder, known as House Rock, lies near the southeastern rim. A smaller boulder that is almost certainly a fragment of House Rock is officially known as South Boulder, but unofficially known as Outhouse Rock. The ray system, which can be seen from orbit, was not obvious on the ground.

North Ray cuts into the Cayley Formation of Imbrian age, but the crater itself is much younger, of Copernican age, based on the presence of rays. (See also section on age below.)

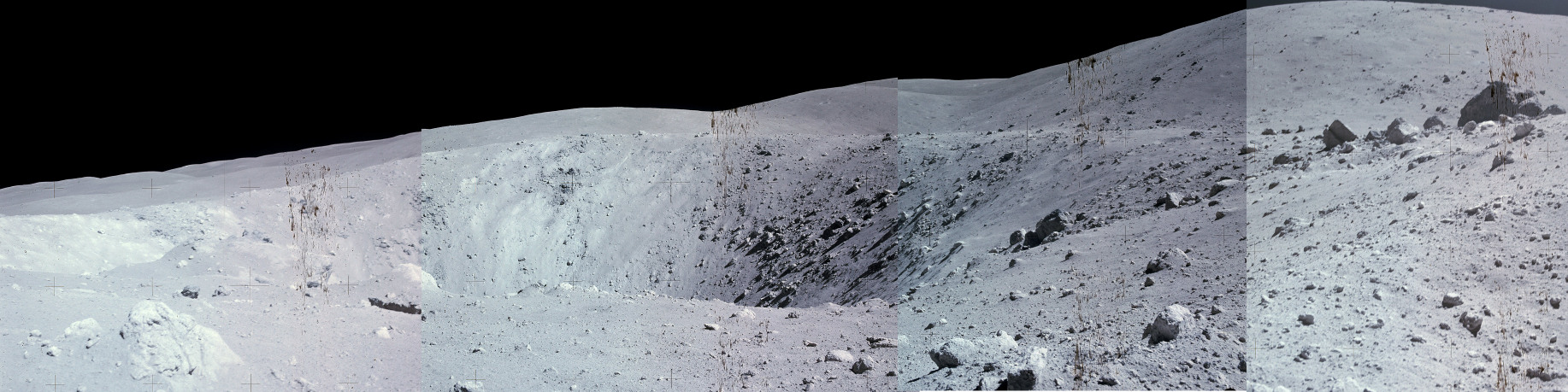
Panorama of North Ray Crater from the south rim. House Rock is at right edge. Compare with the map below.

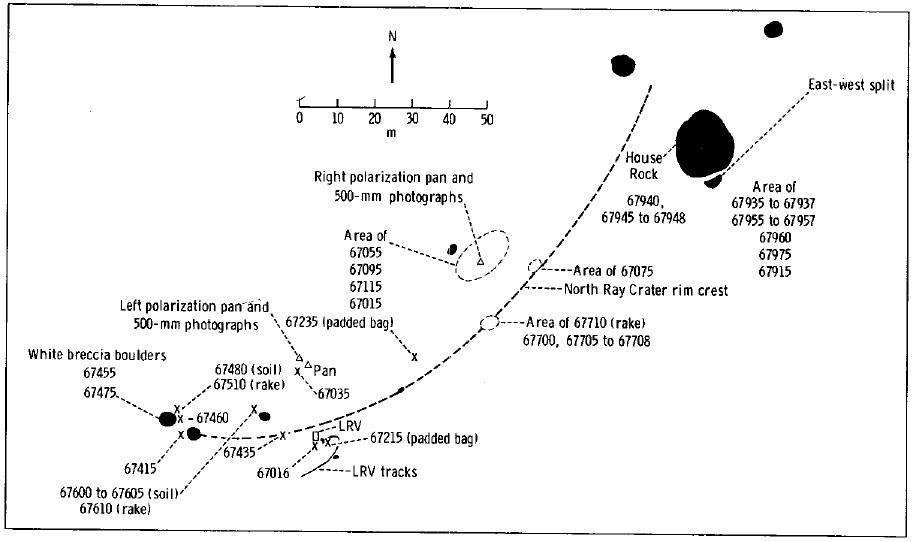
Planimetric map of Station 11 from the Apollo 16 Preliminary Science Report. X indicates sample locations, 5-digit numbers are LRL sample numbers, rectangle is lunar rover (dot indicates TV camera), black spots are large rocks, dashed lines are crater rims or other topographic features, and triangles are panorama stations.

== Gallery ==
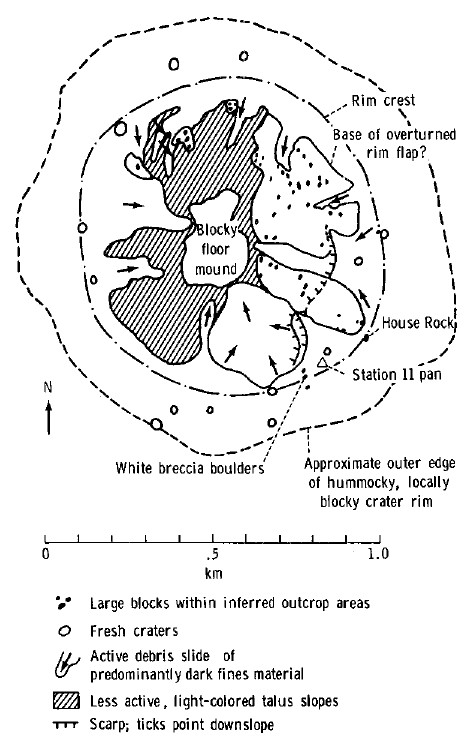
Geologic map of North Ray crater

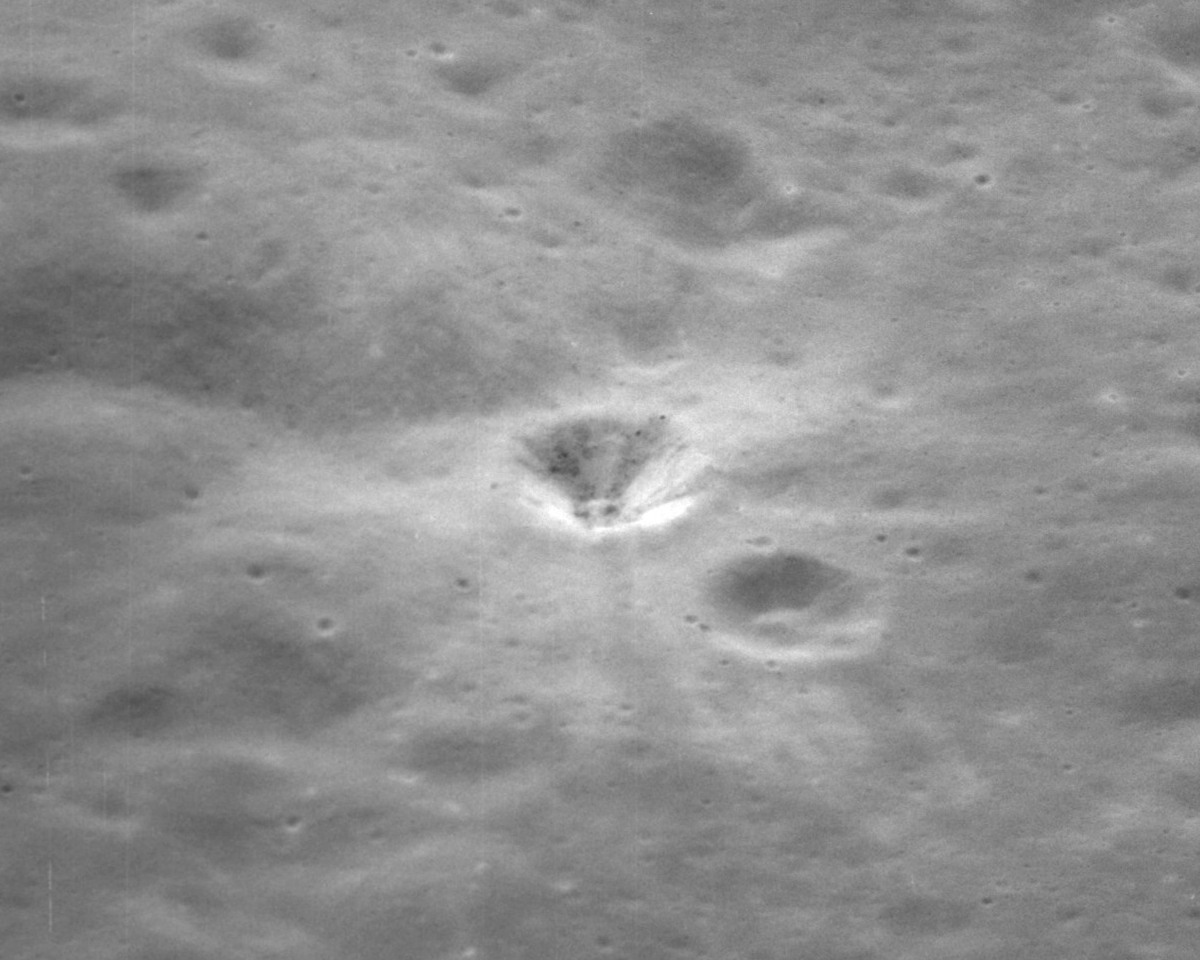
Oblique Apollo 14 image, facing east

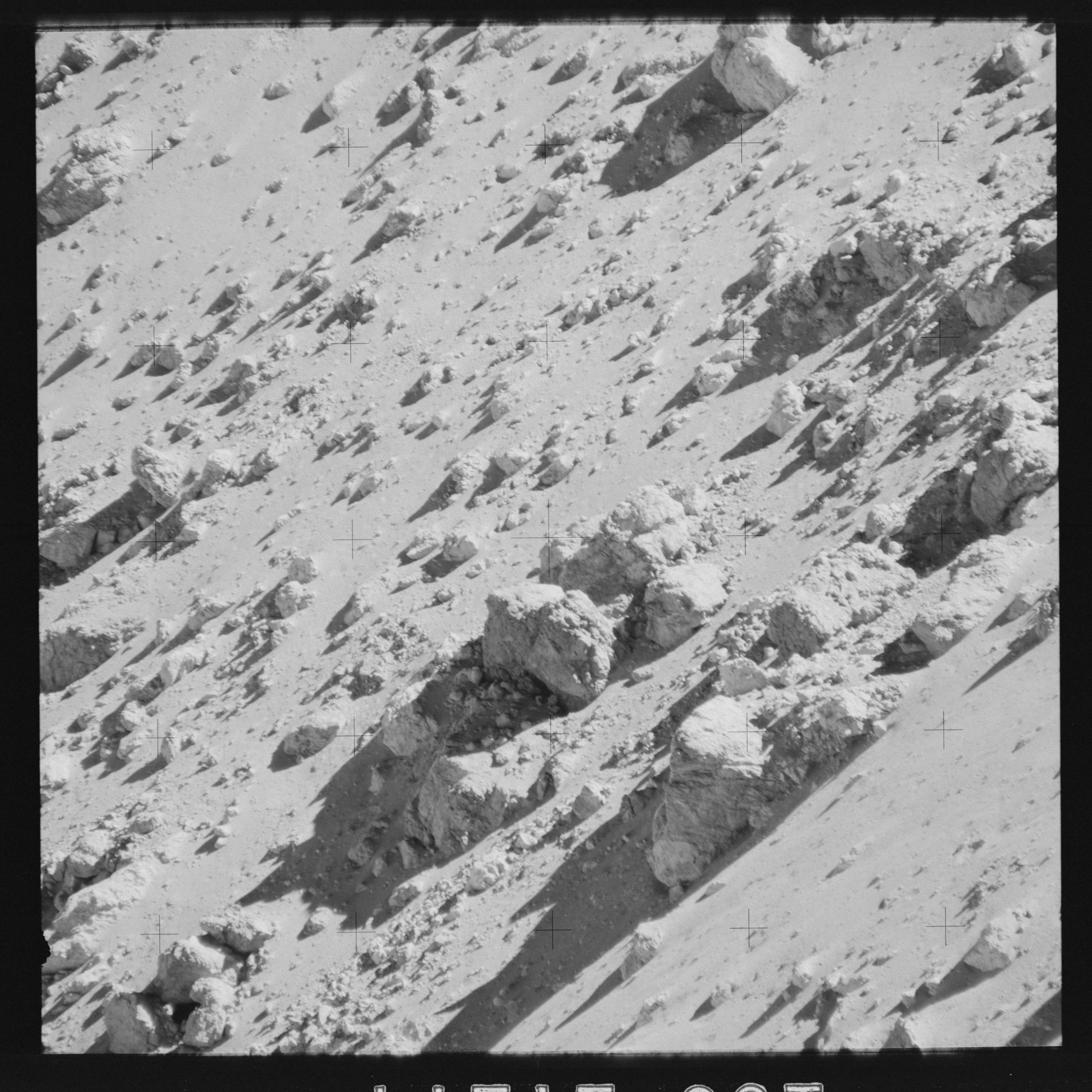
Telephoto image of rocks in the interior walls of the crater

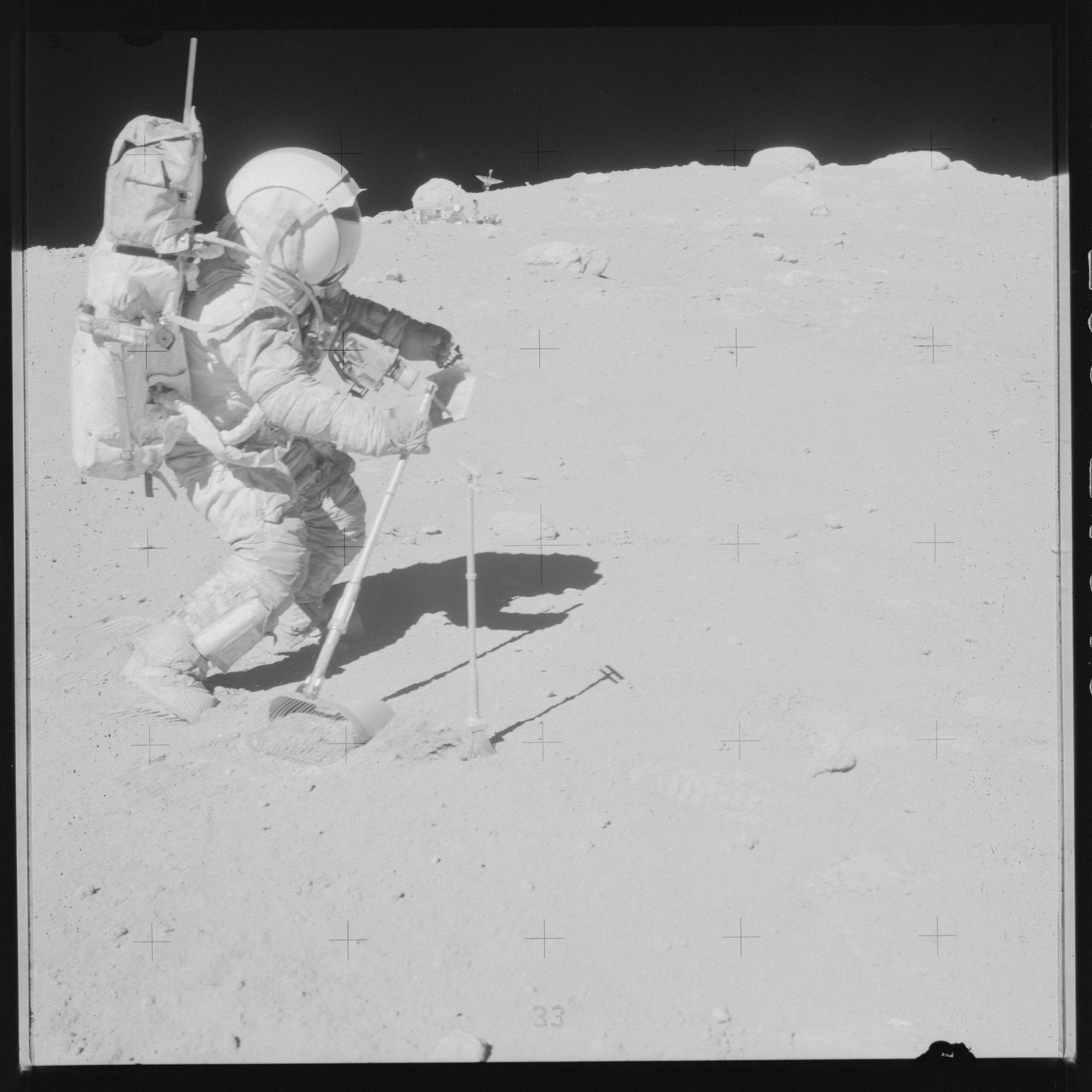
John Young using the rake tool to collect a sample (67700) at the southeast rim, with the rover at the central horizon, and white breccia boulders at the right horizon

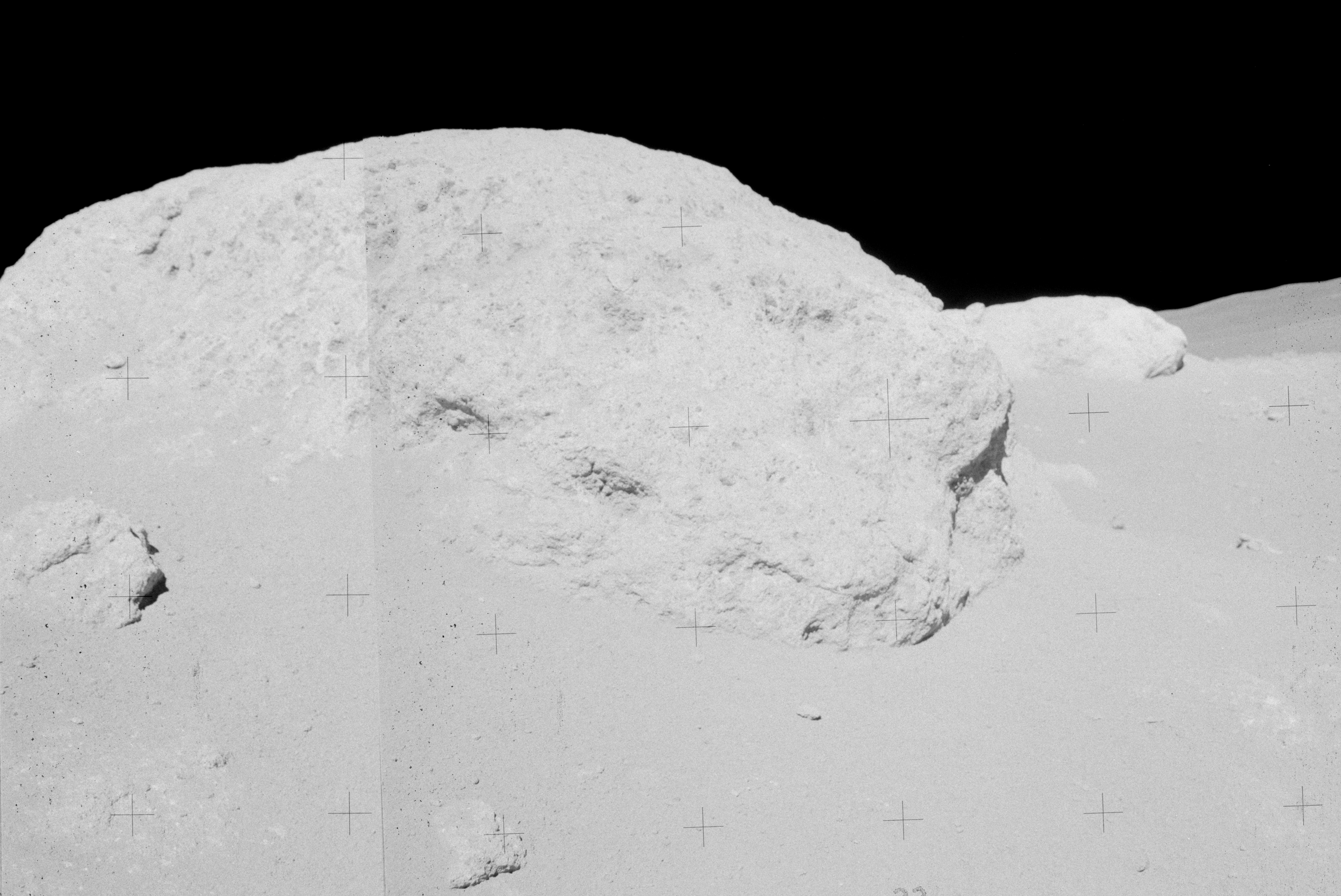
White breccia boulder along the south rim of the crater, showing typical dark-clast population, rounded, unjointed surfaces, and well-developed fillet

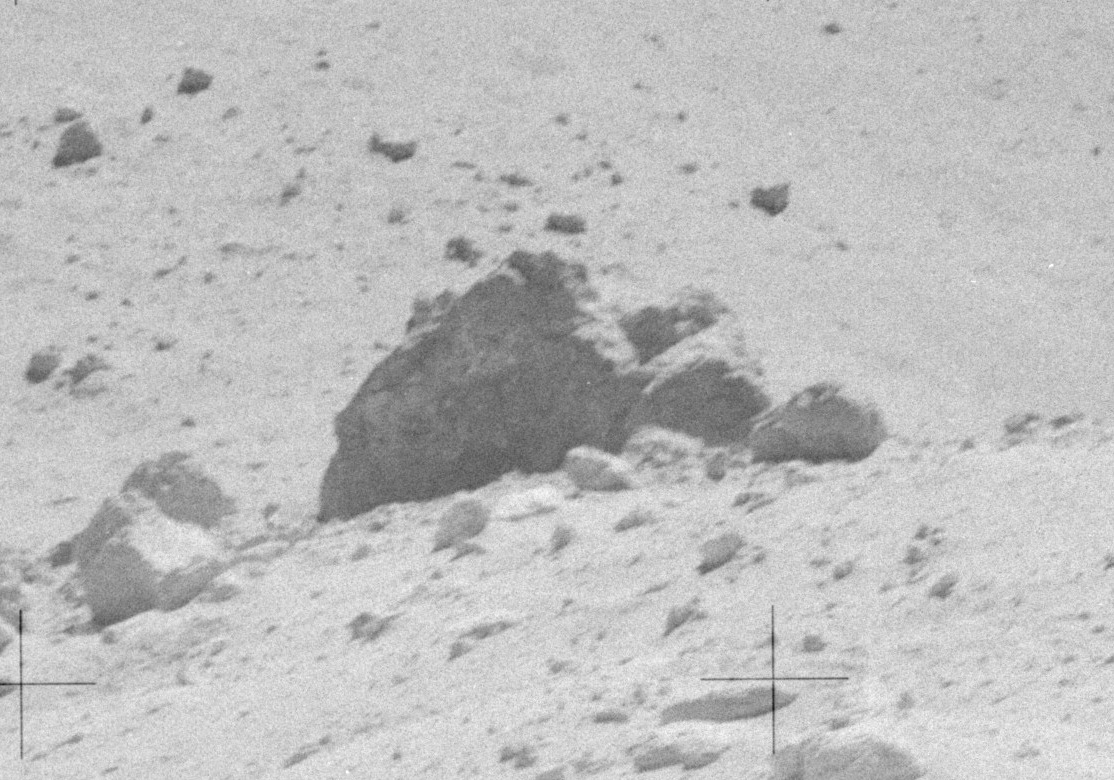
House rock as viewed from the white breccia boulders (looking northeast)

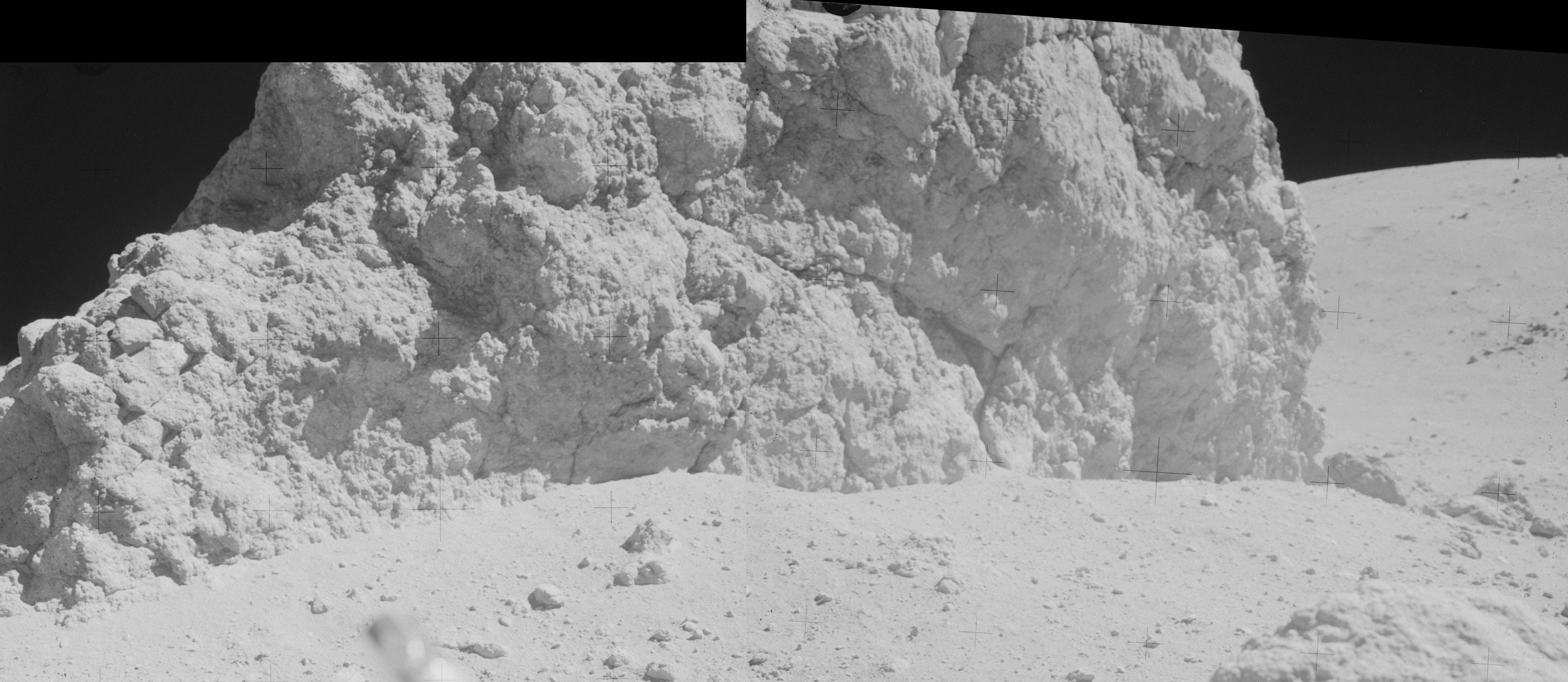
East side of House Rock

== Age ==
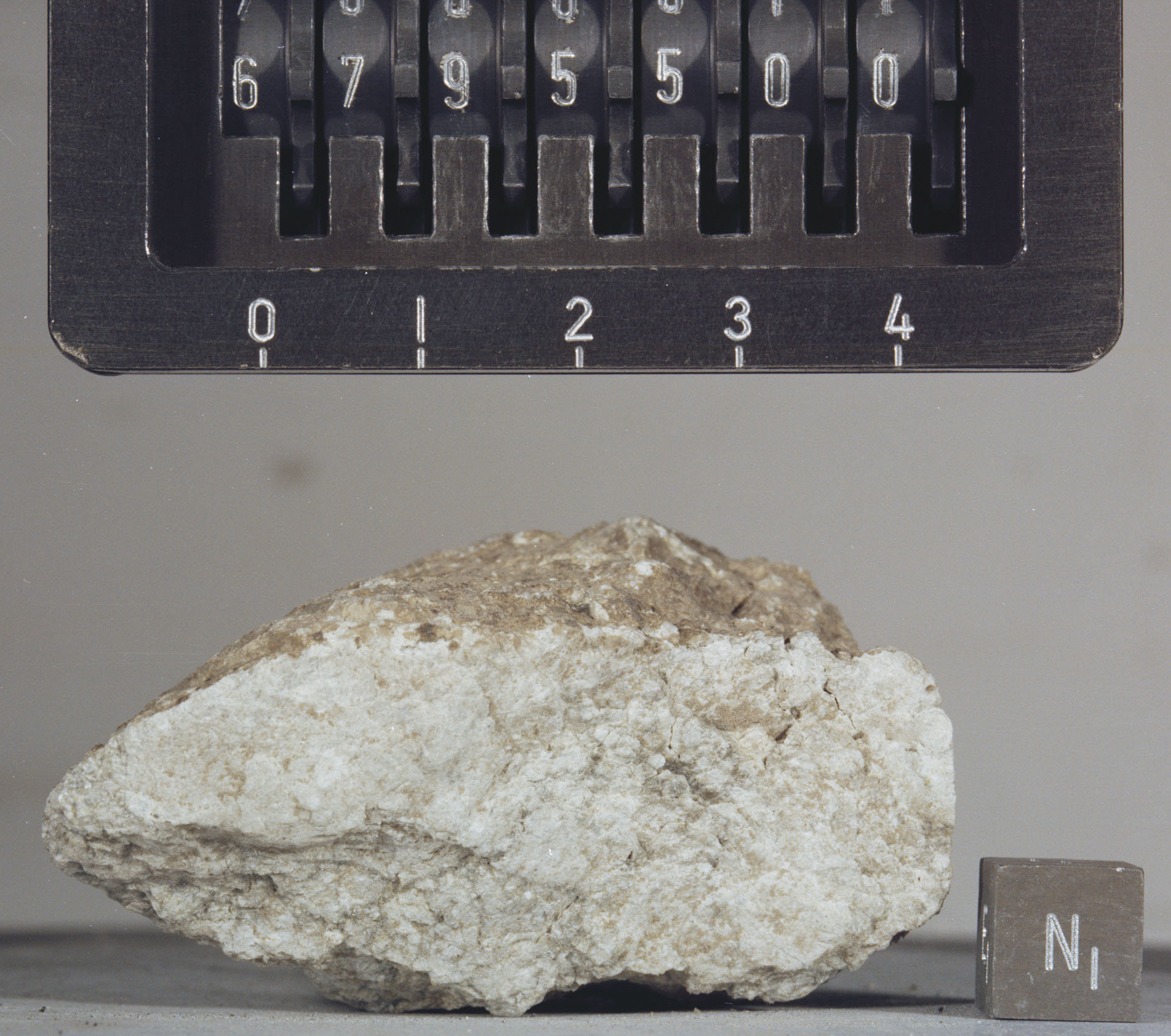
Lunar sample 67955 was used to date the impact at about 50 million years ago.

Based on sample 67955, a noritic anorthosite collected from Outhouse Rock, the impact that created North Ray crater was about 50 million year ago. This is based on the measured duration of the rock's exposure to cosmic rays. The rock itself is dated at 4.20 ± 0.07 b.y. by Sm/Nd radiometric dating.

== Samples ==
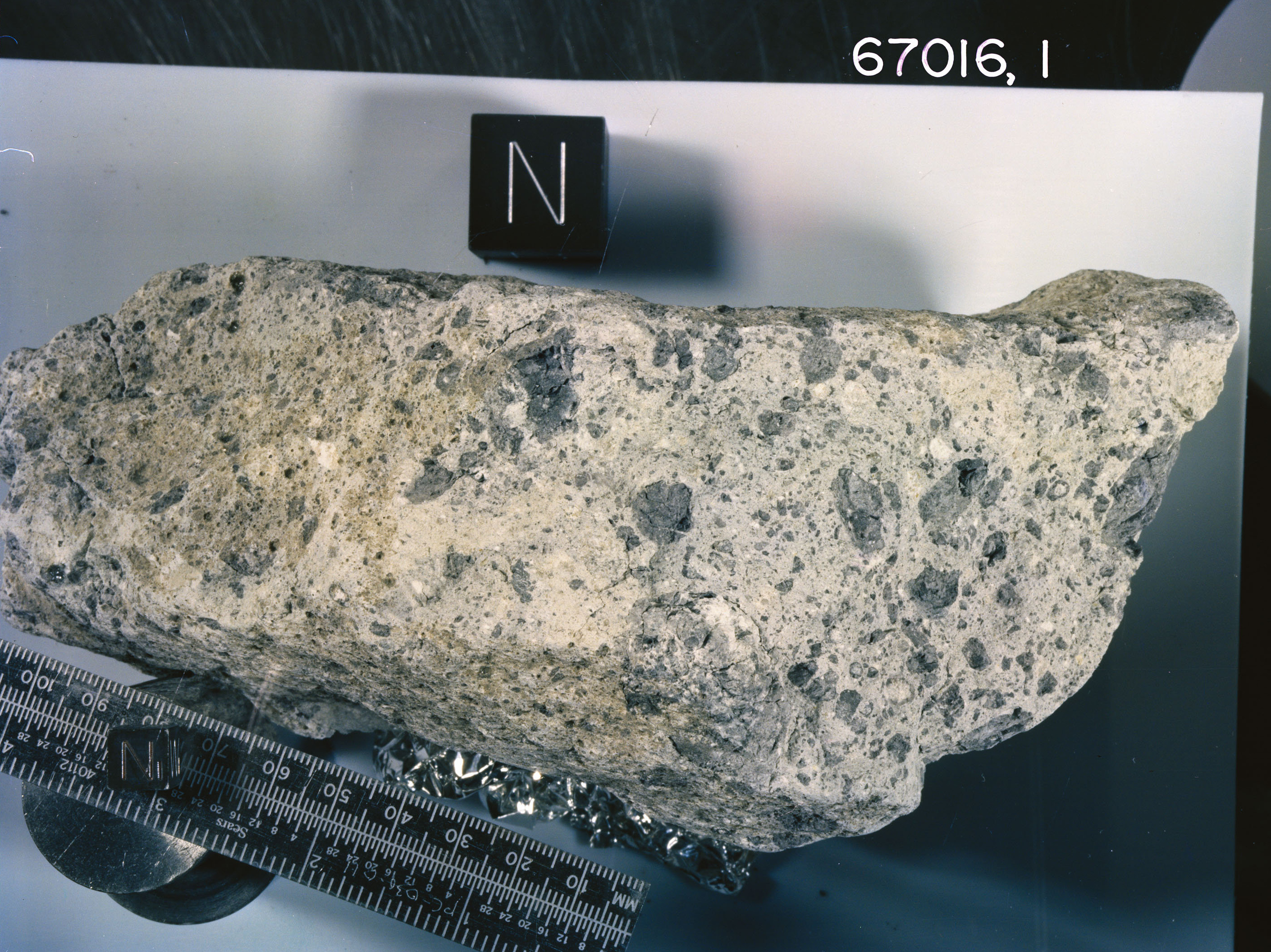
Lunar sample 67016, found lying on the ground next to the rover

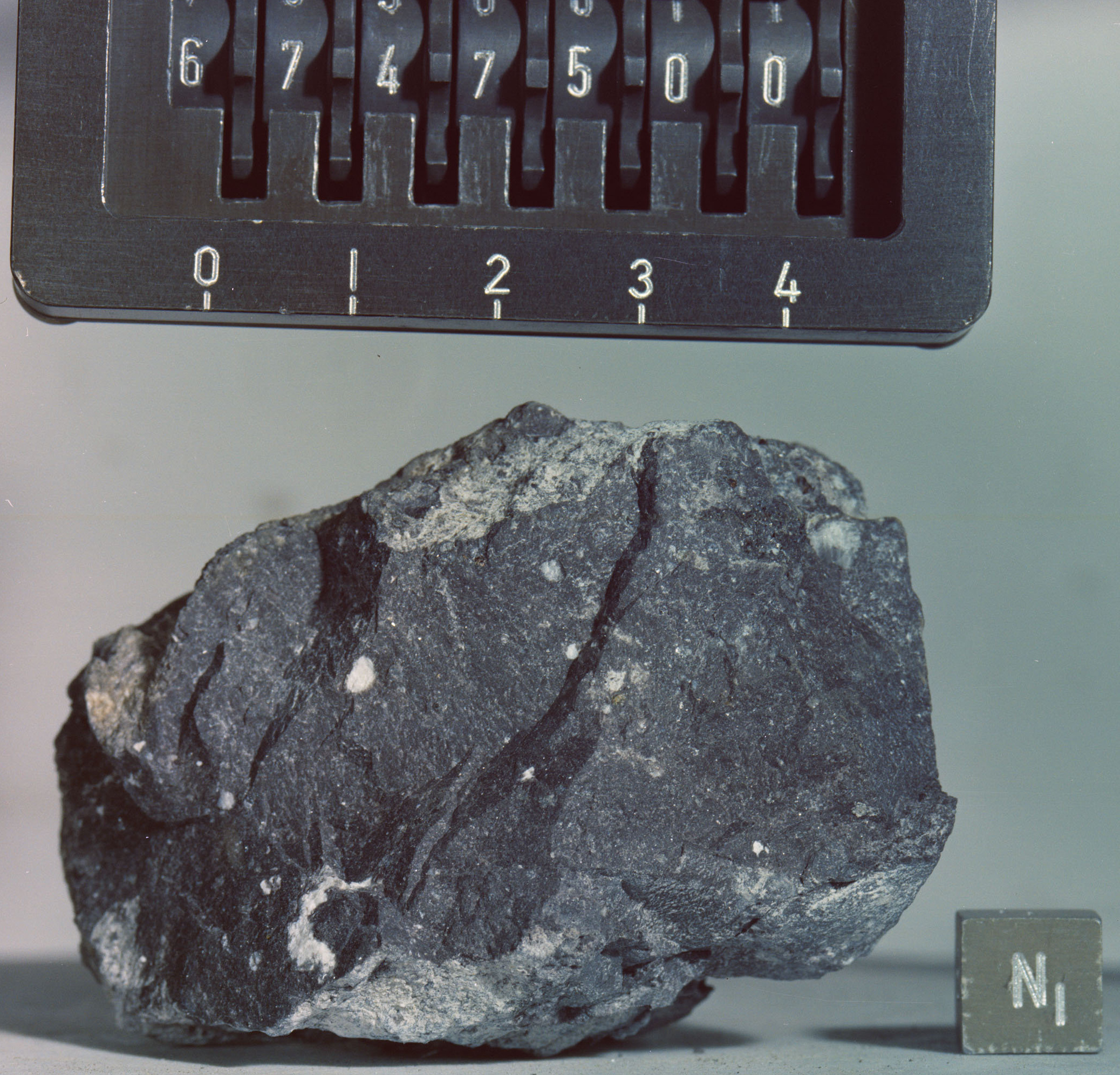
Lunar sample 67475, a clast was removed from one of the white breccia boulders shown above

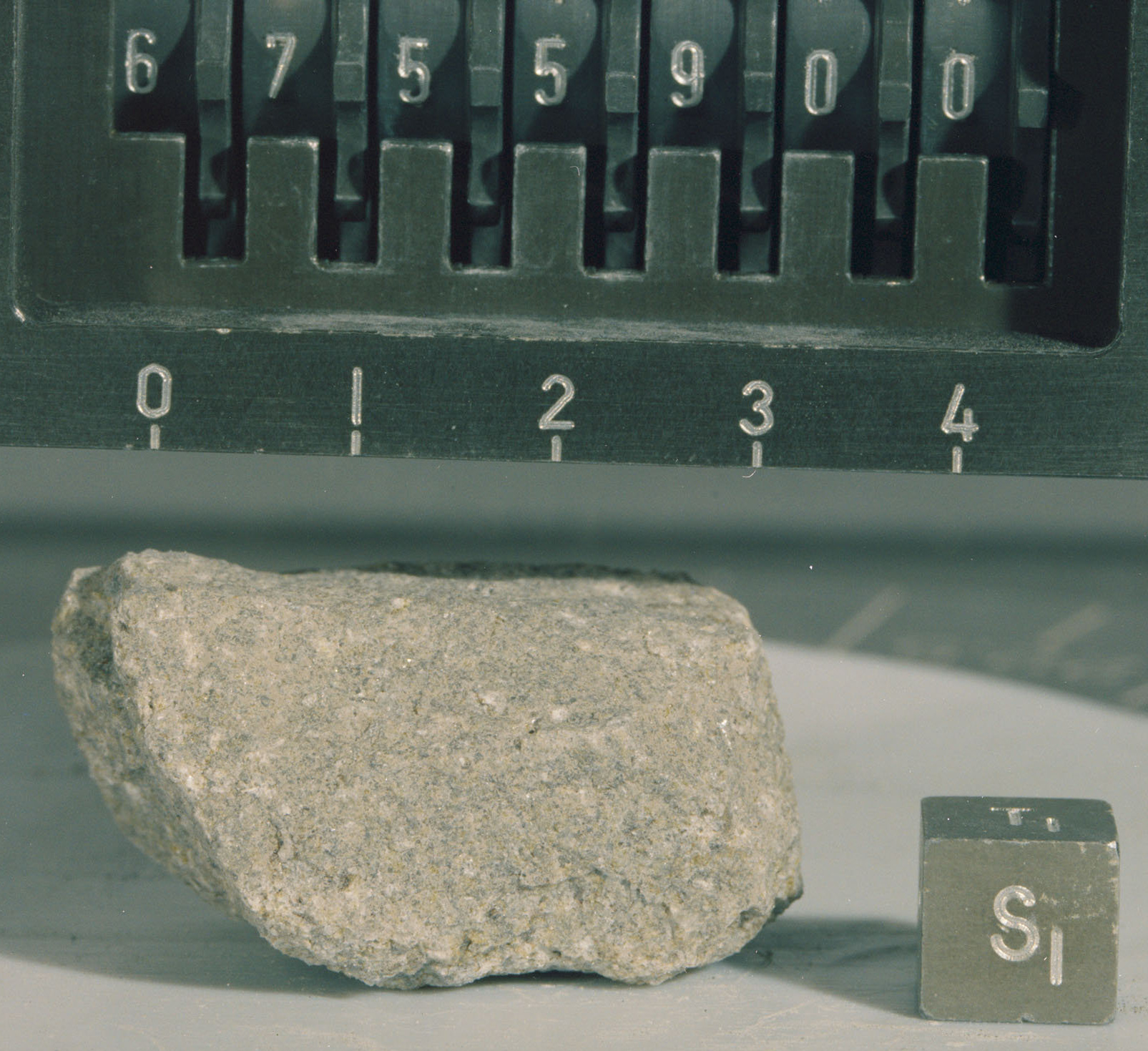
Lunar sample 67559, found within rake sample 67510

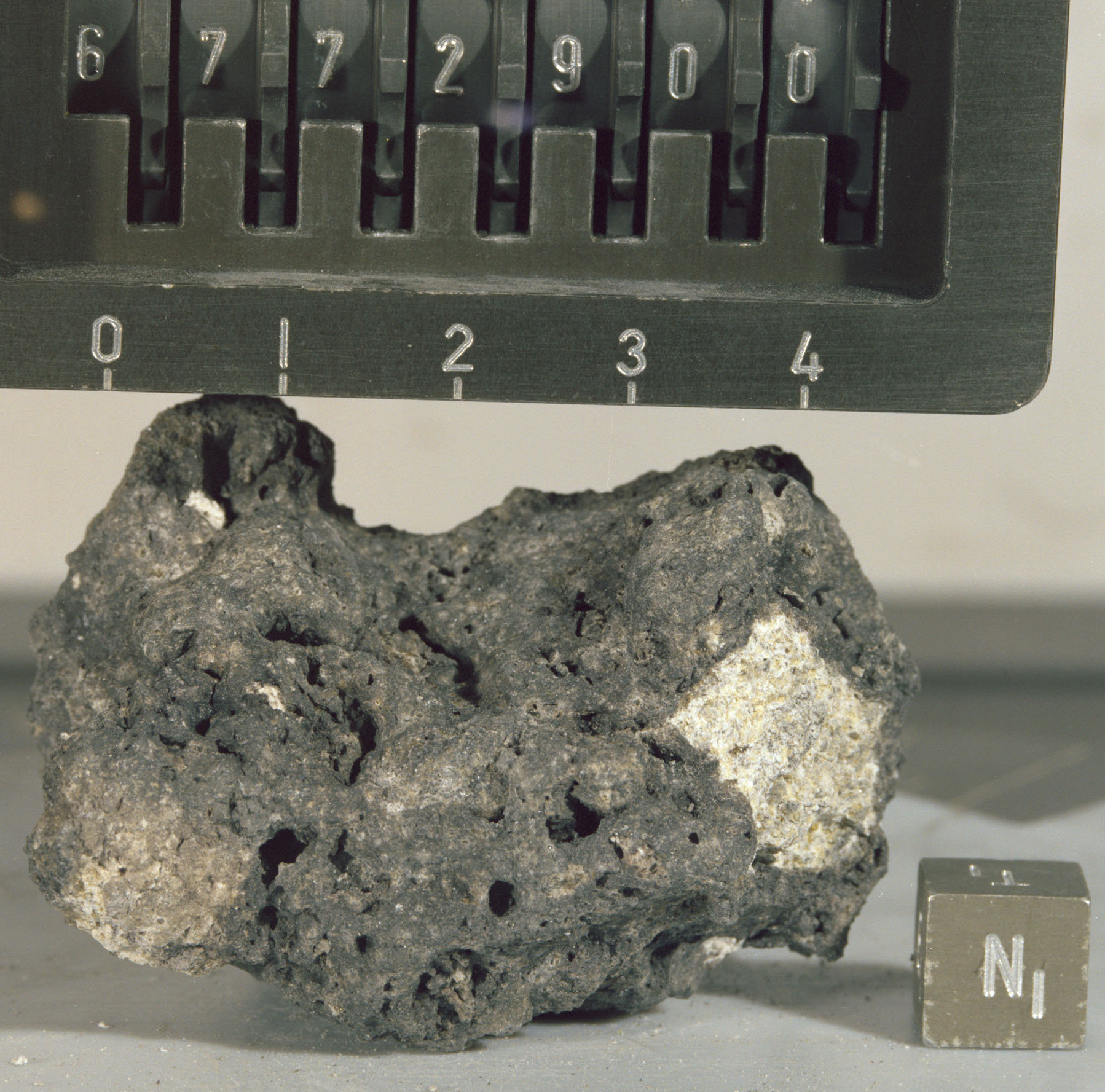
Lunar sample 67729, found within rake sample 67710

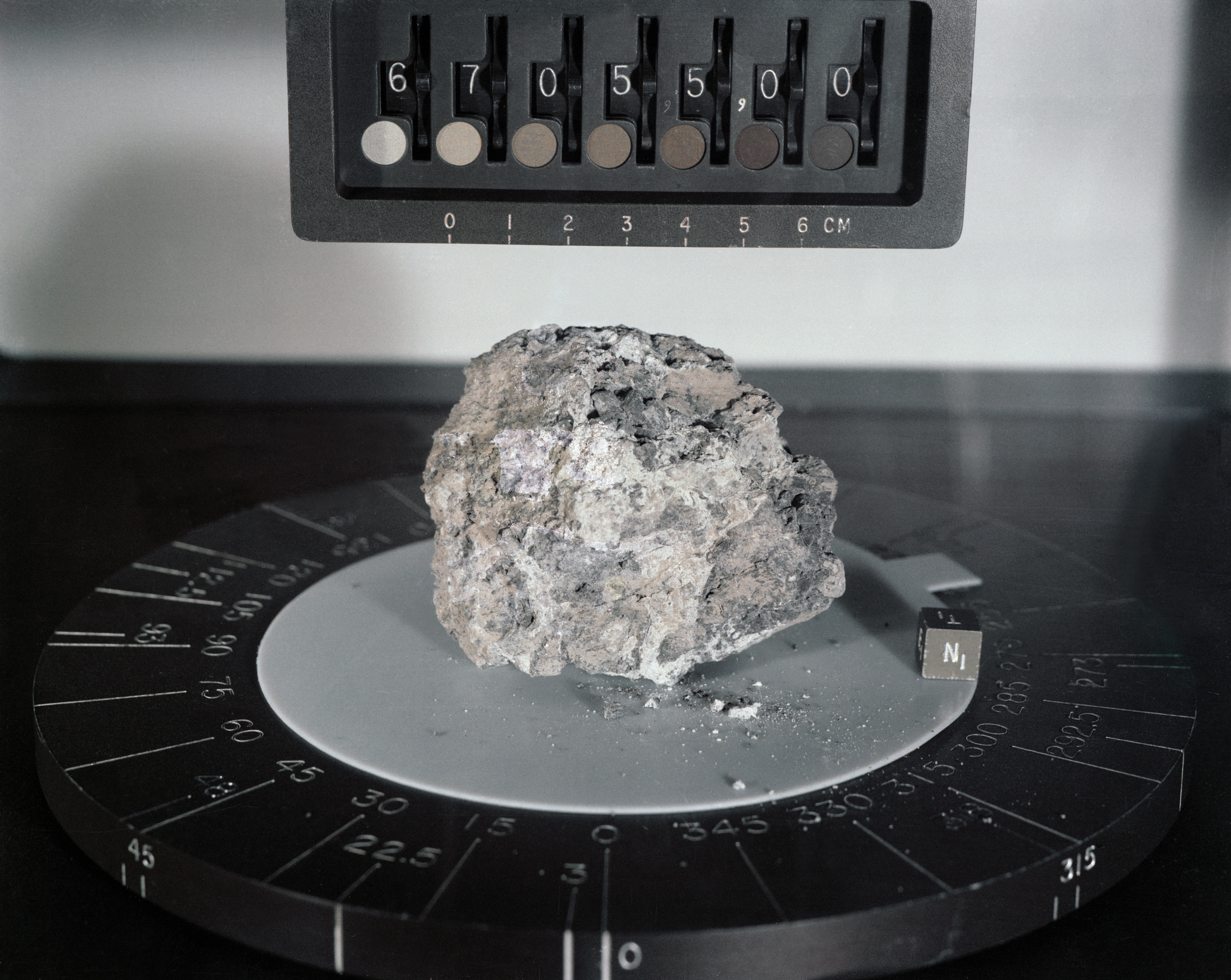
Lunar sample 67055

The following samples were collected from North Ray Crater (Station 11), as listed in Table 6-II of the Apollo 16 Preliminary Science Report, which does not include samples smaller than 25 g weight (of which there were many). Sample type, lithology, and descriptions are from the Lunar Sample Atlas of the Lunar and Planetary Institute.

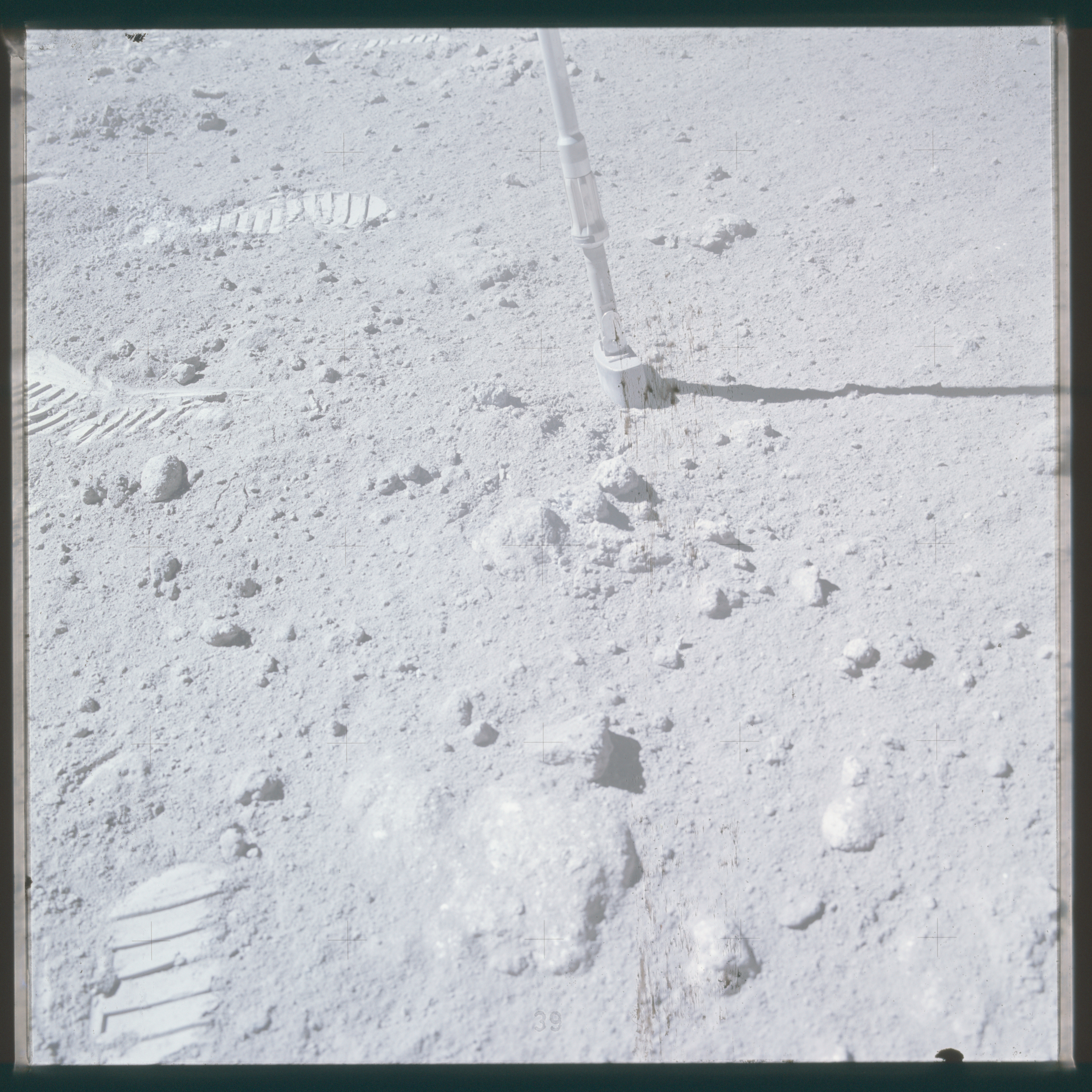
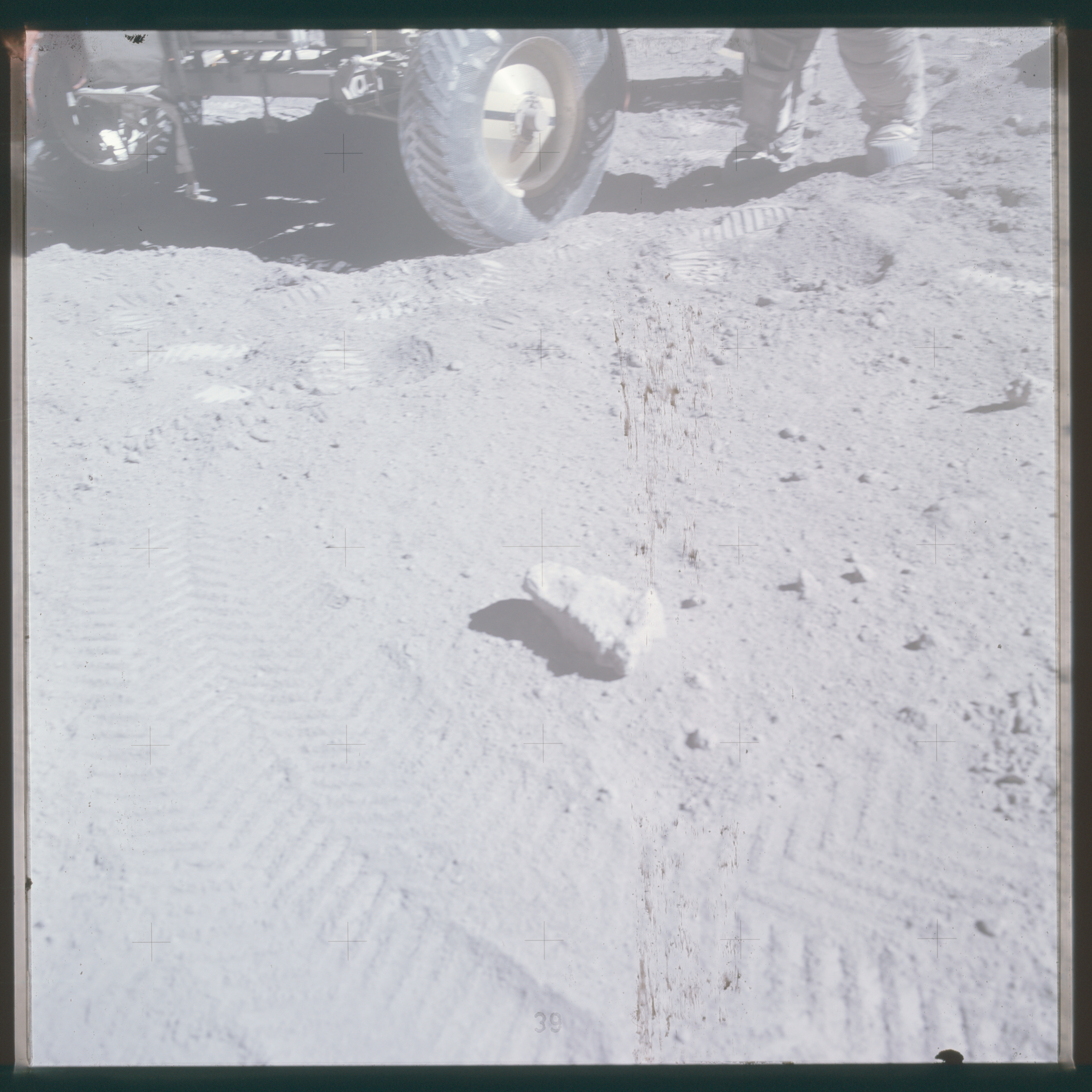
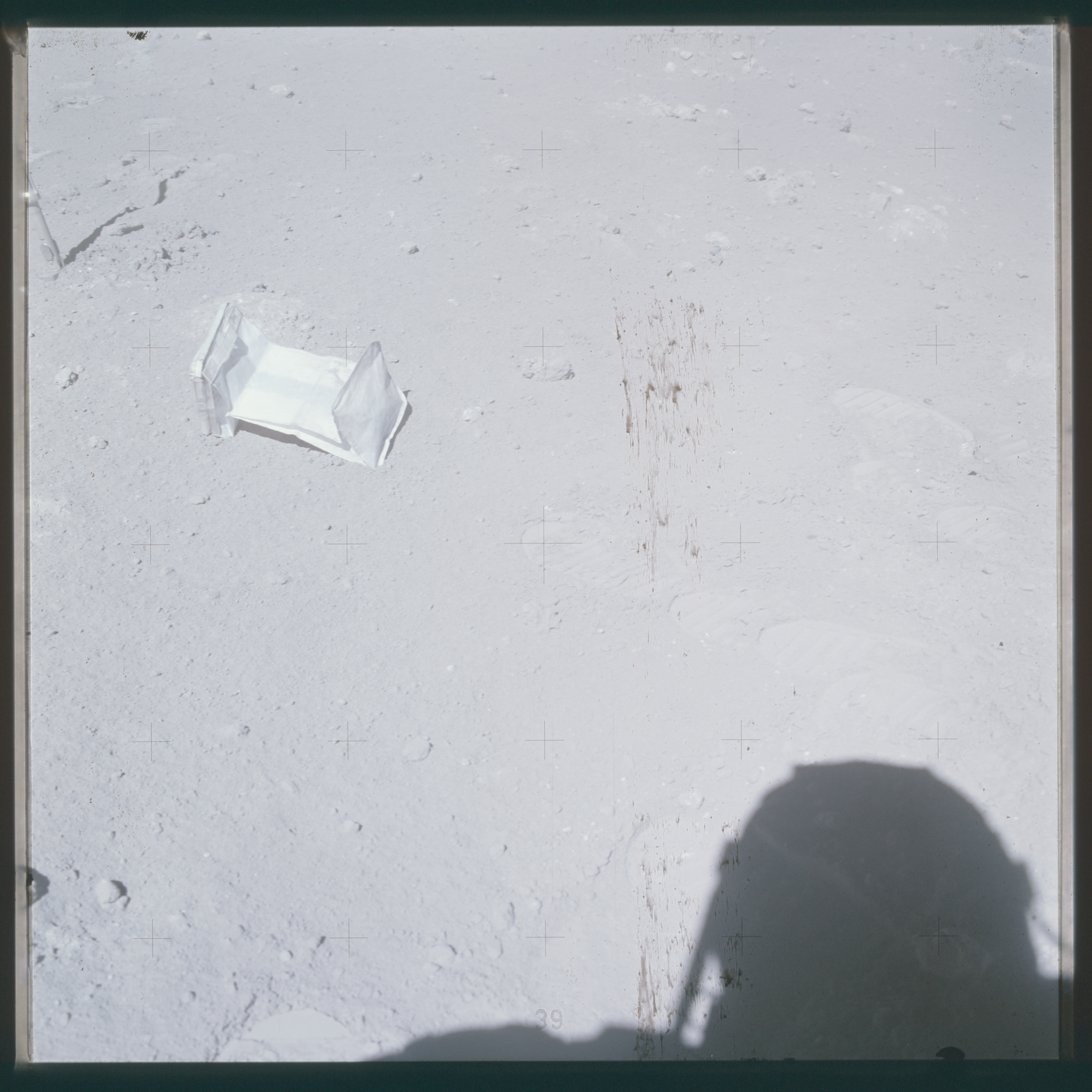
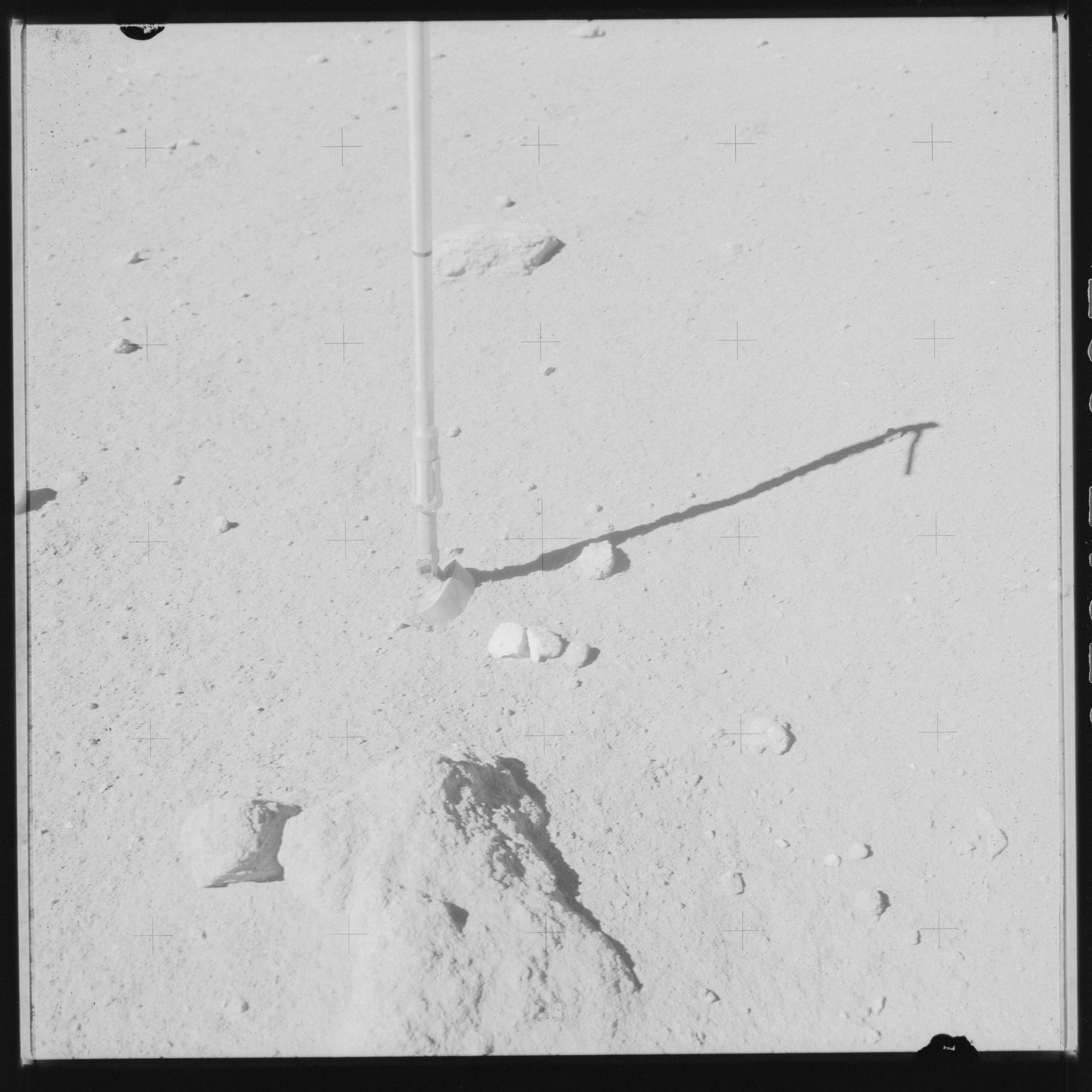
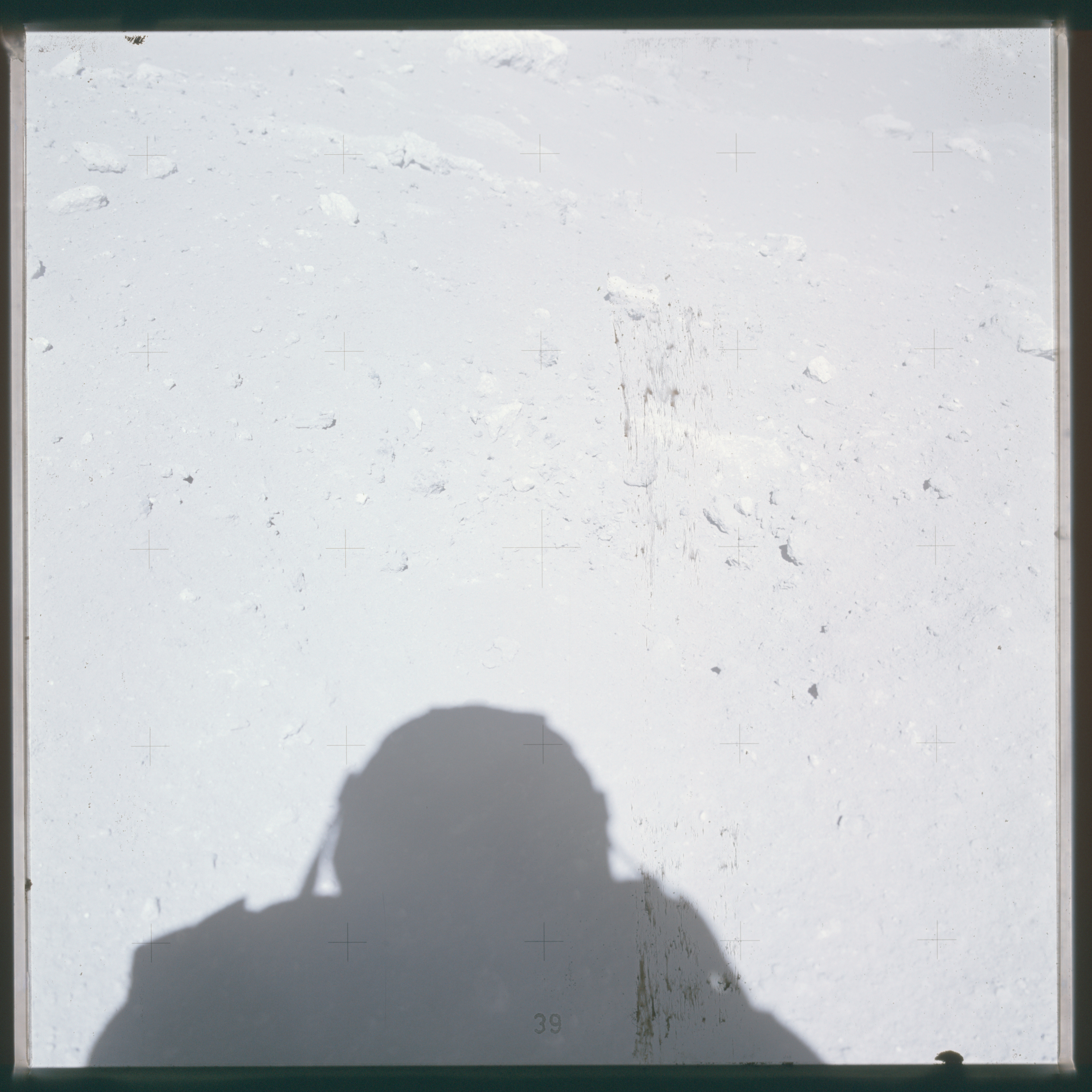
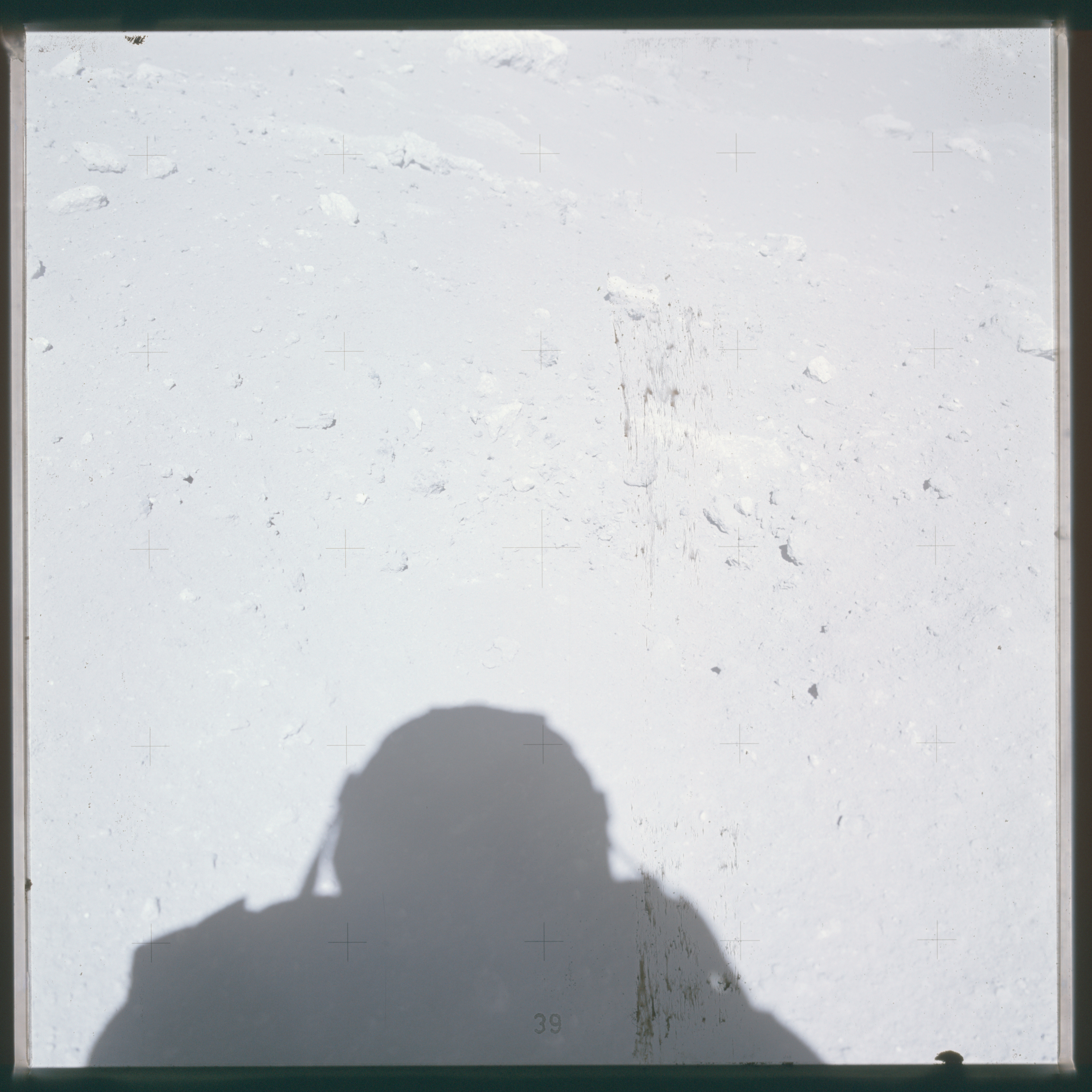
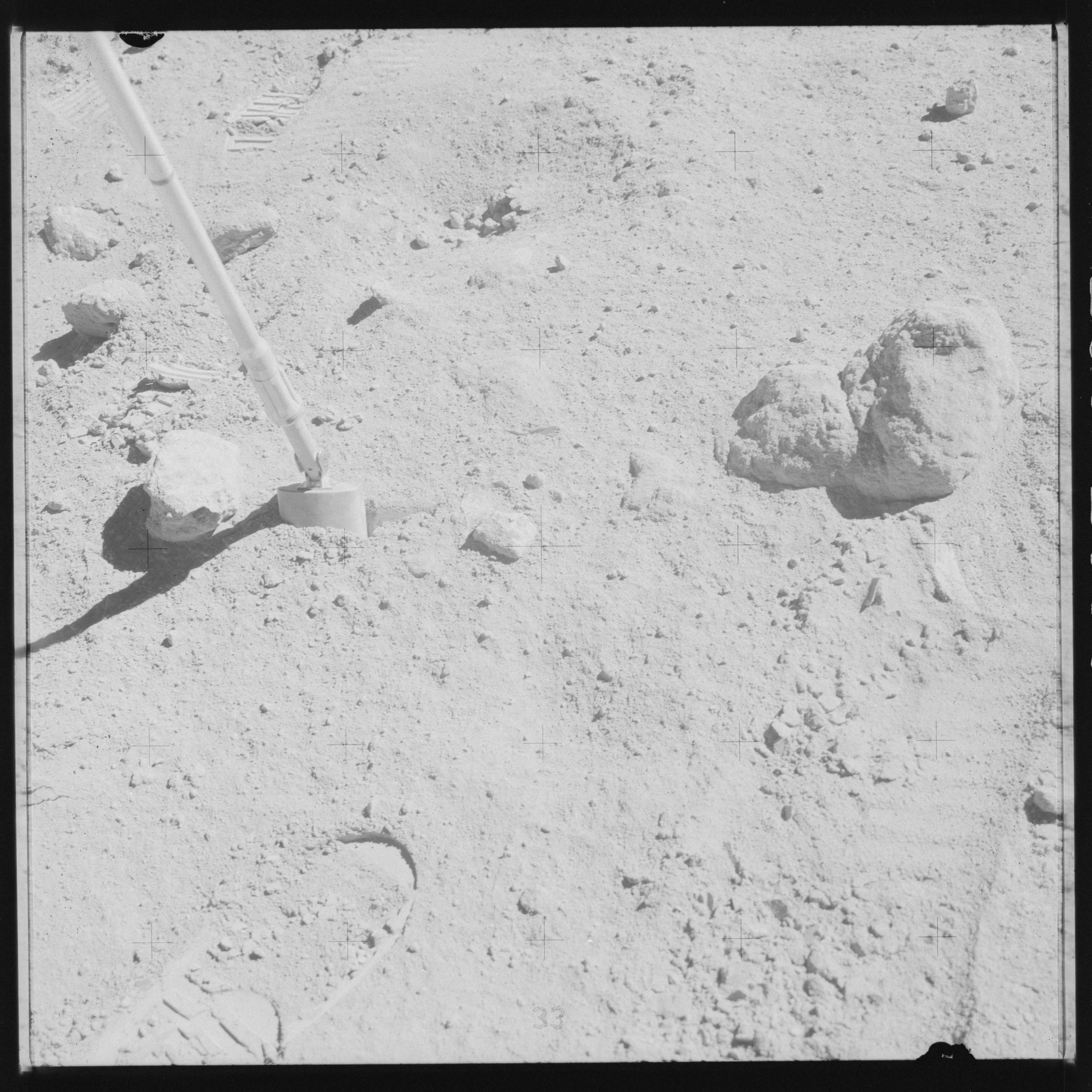
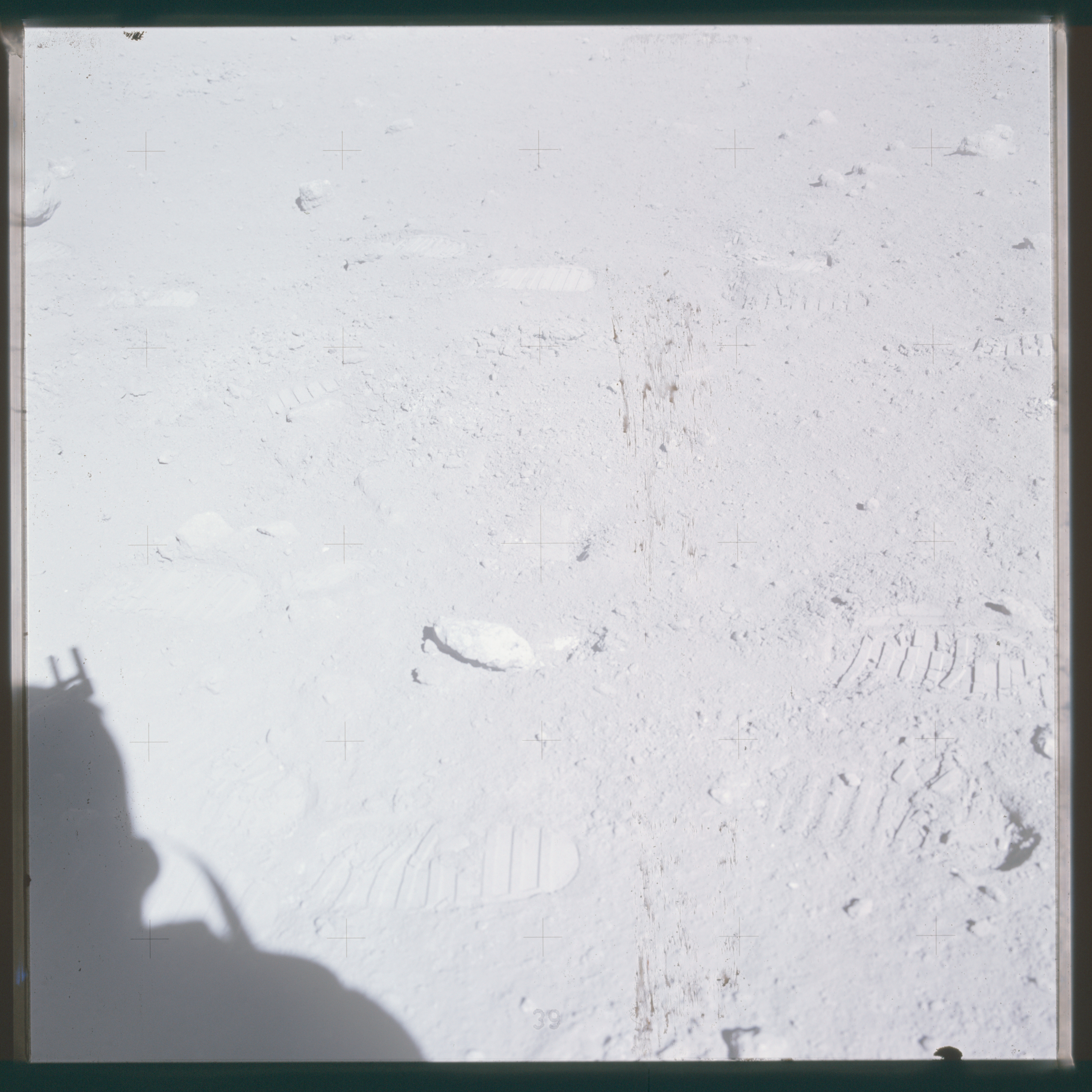
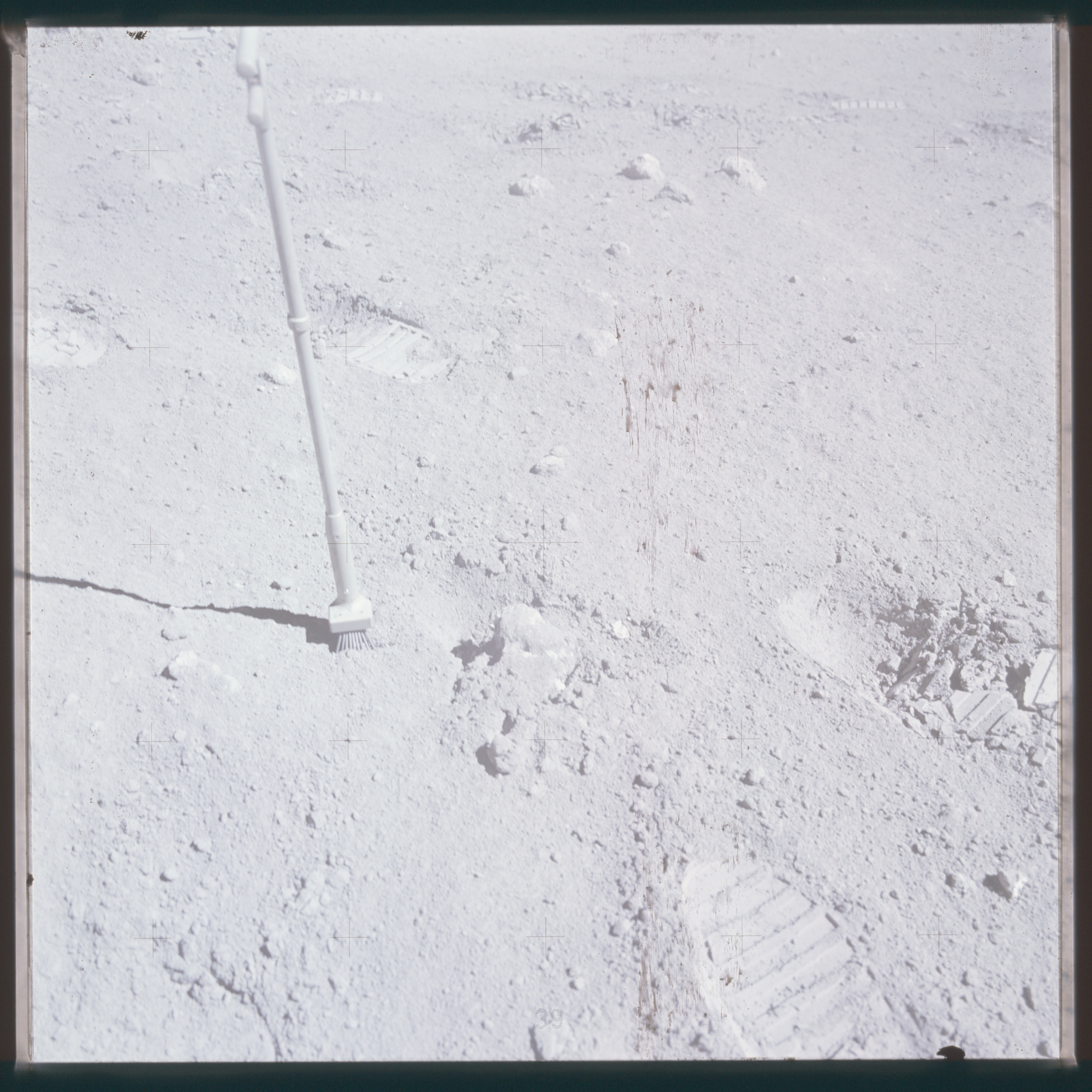
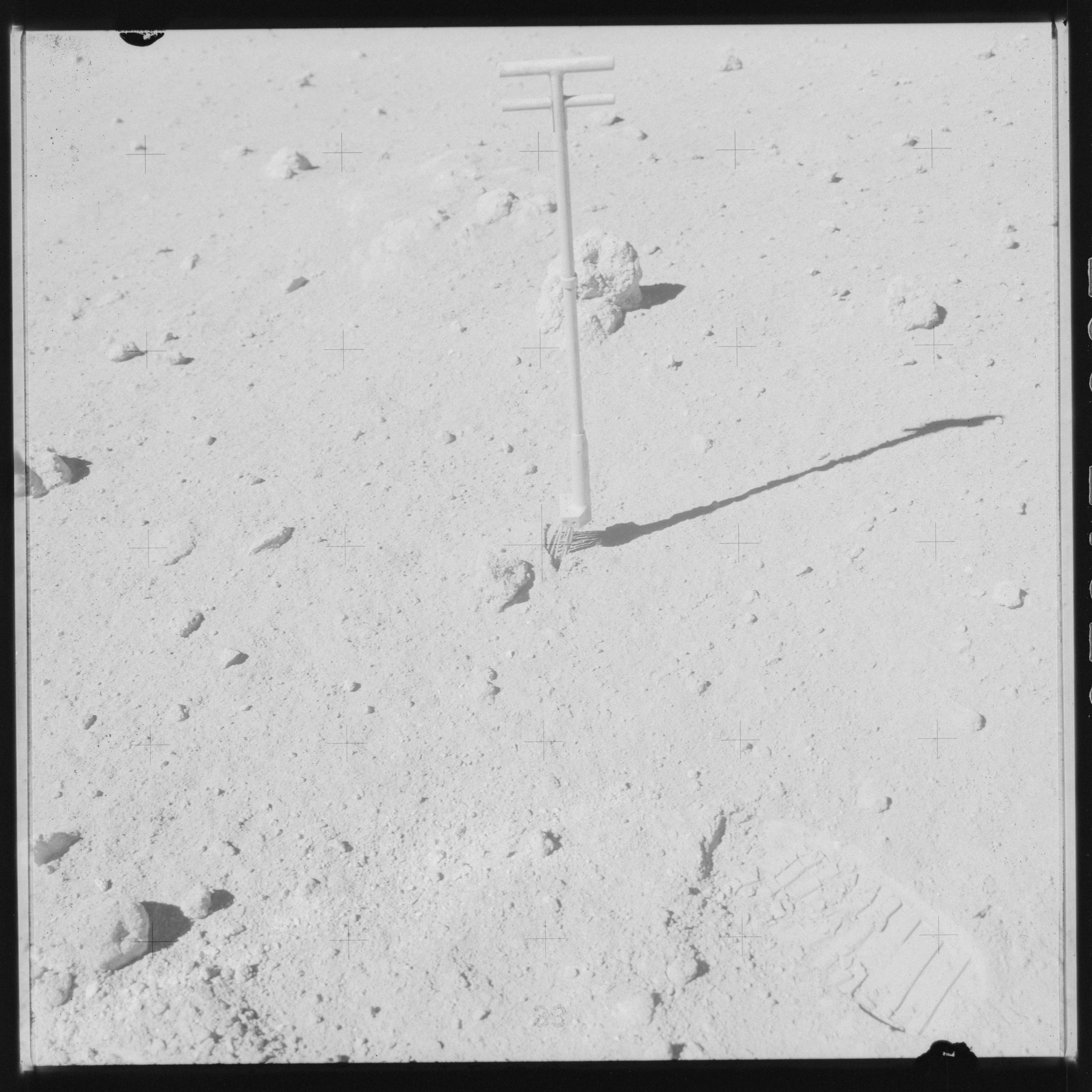
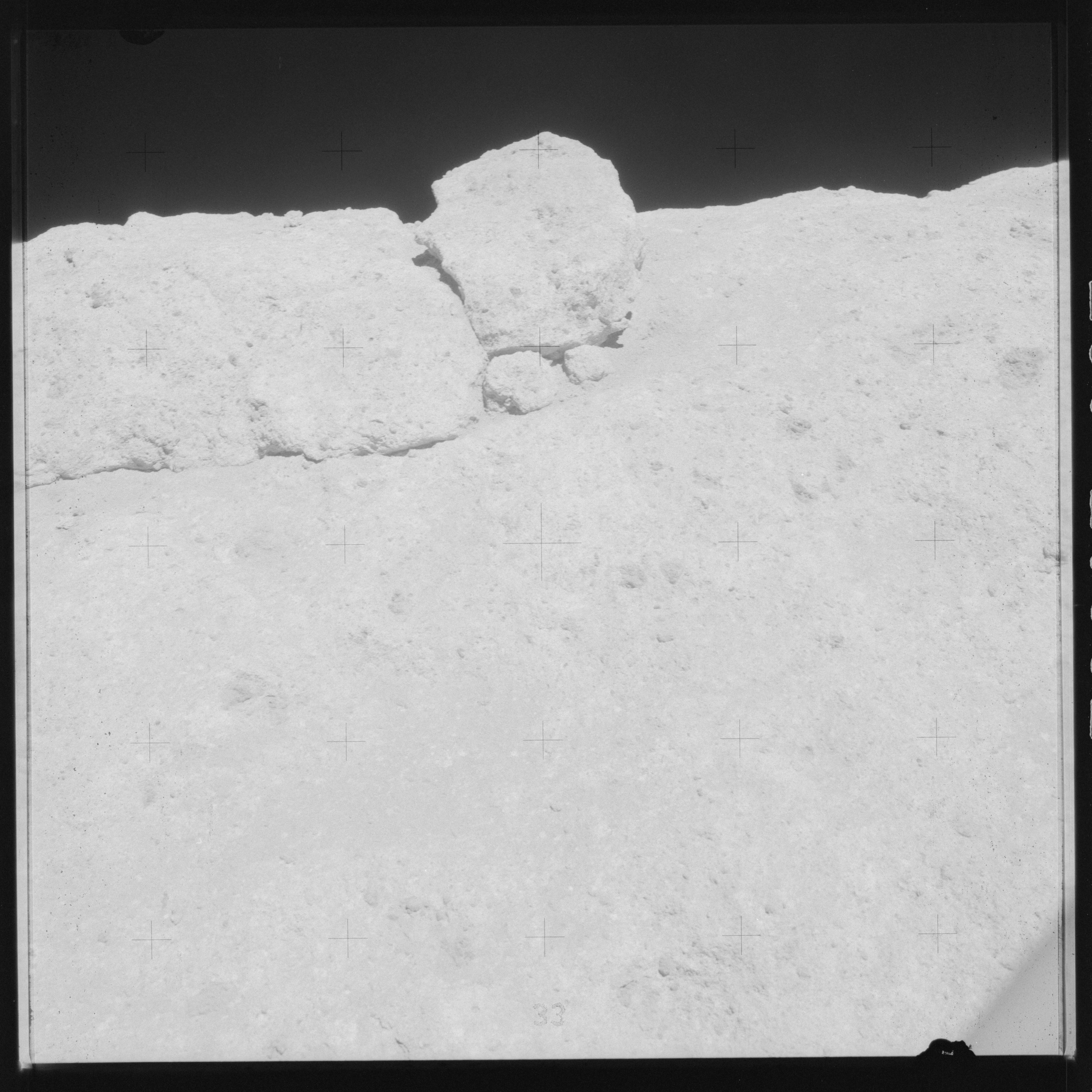
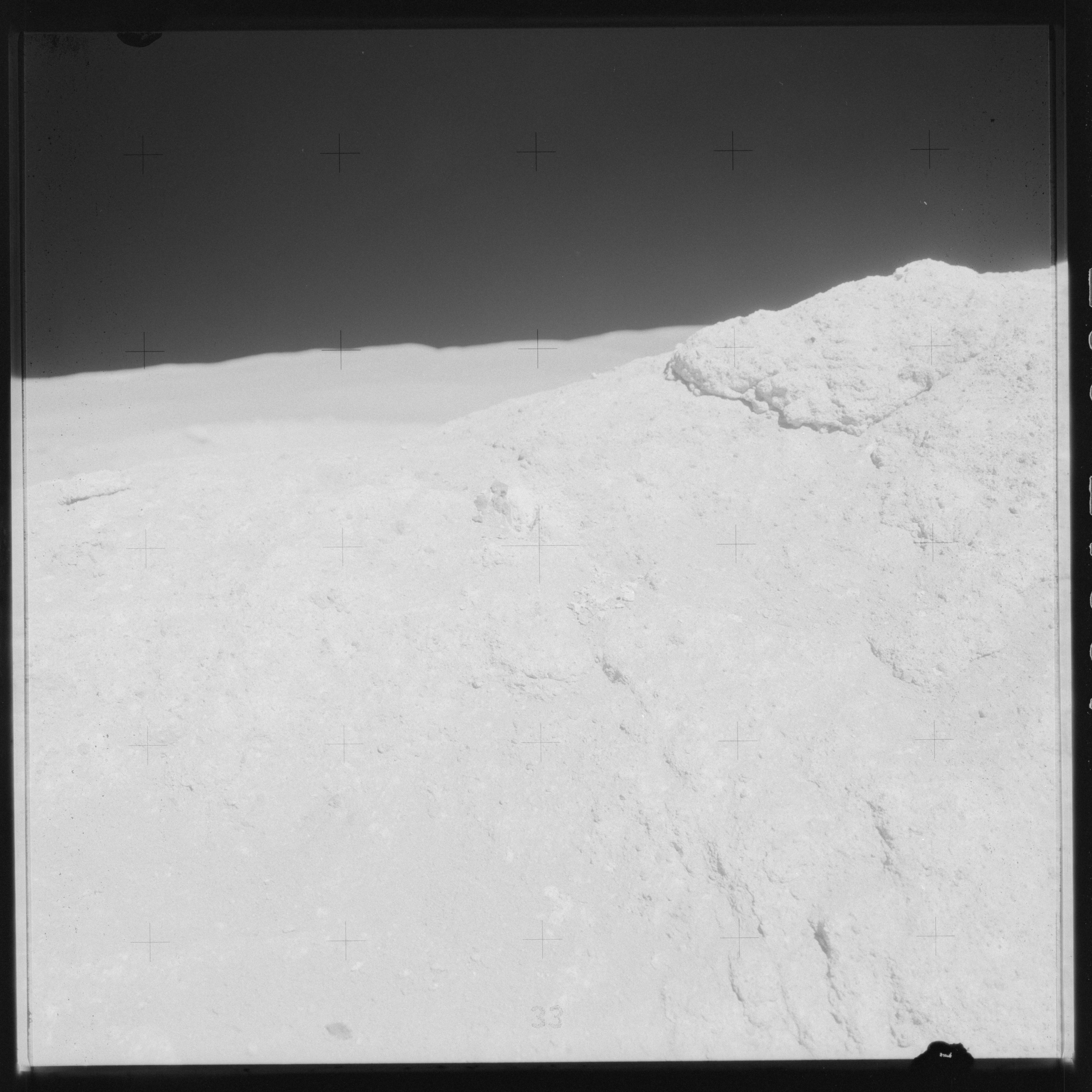
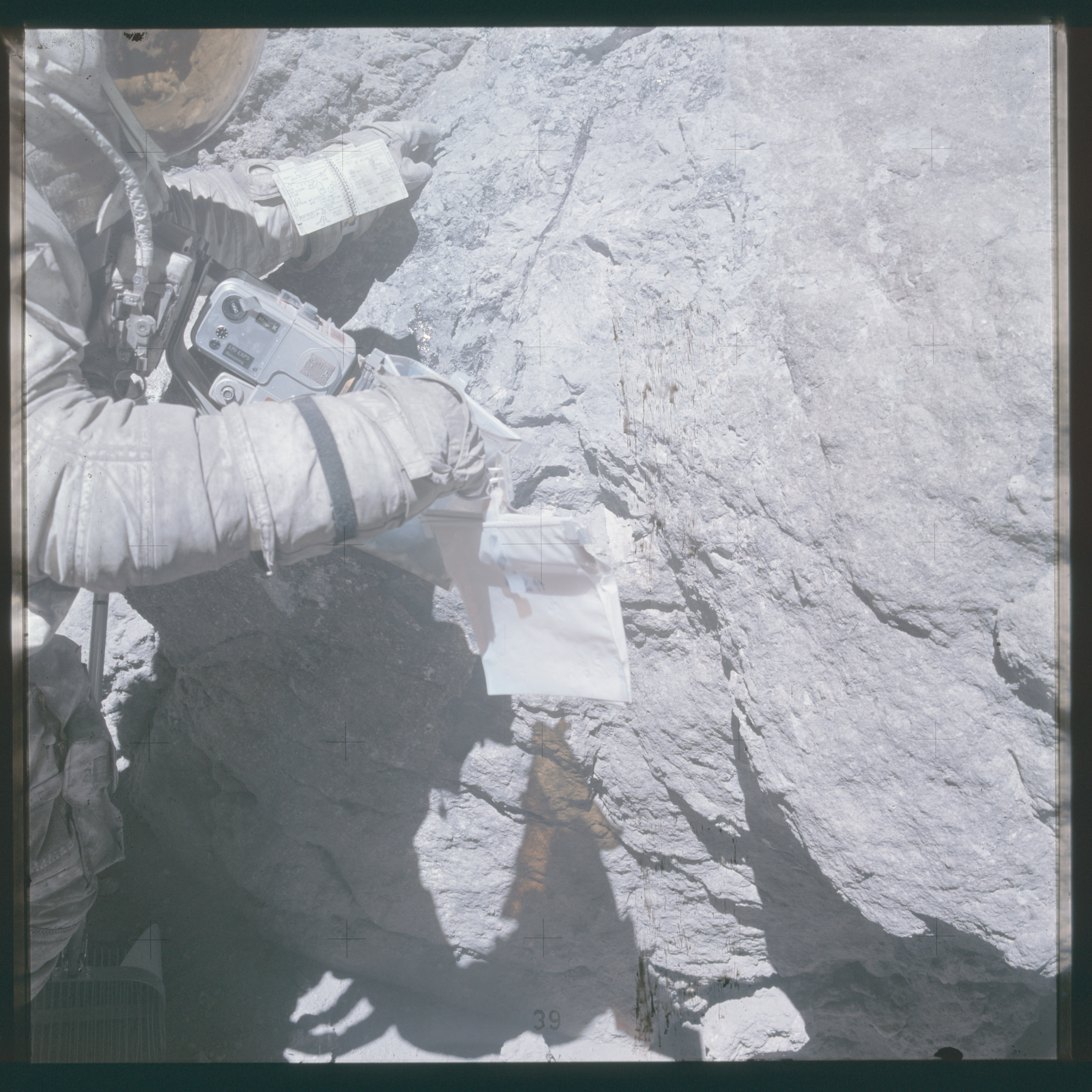
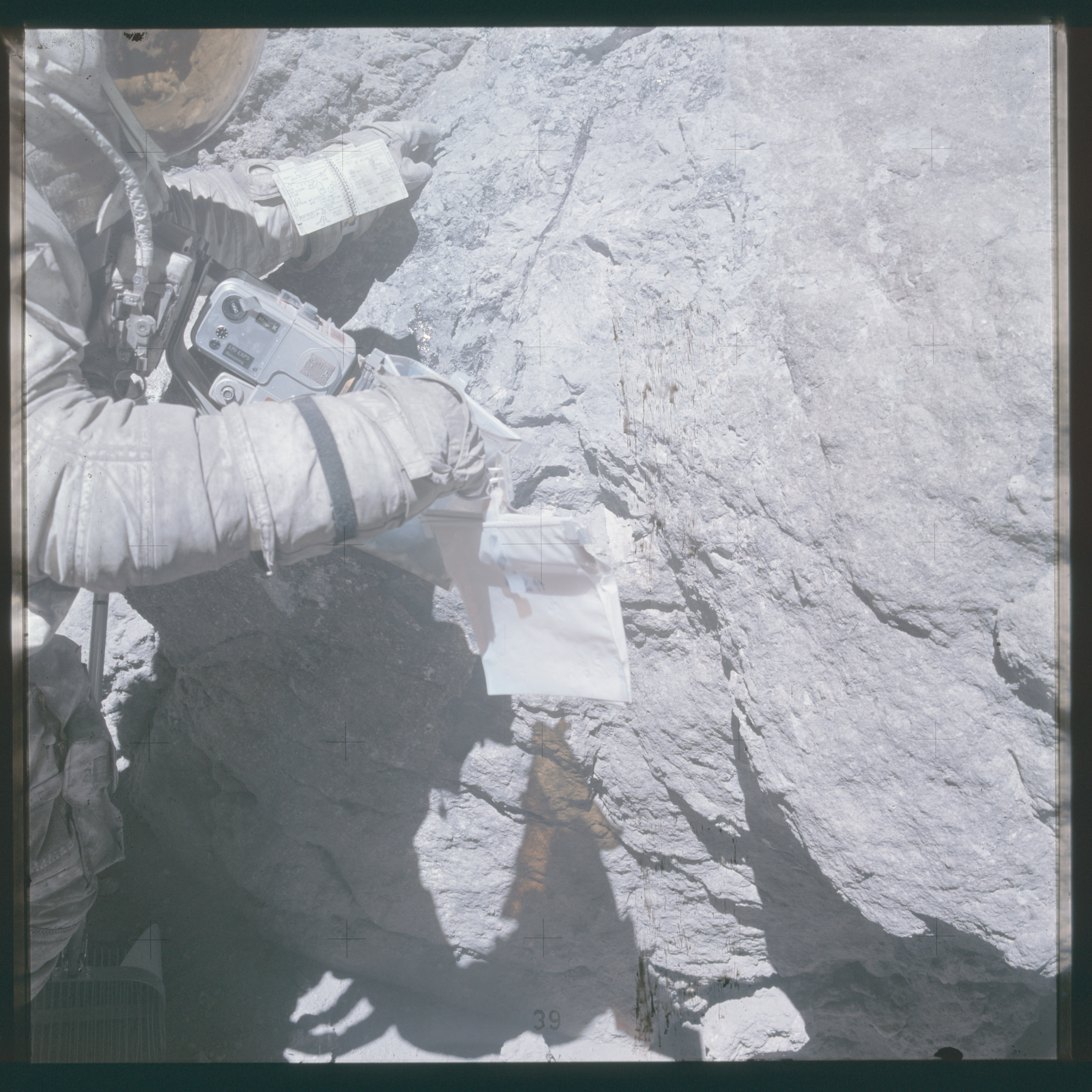
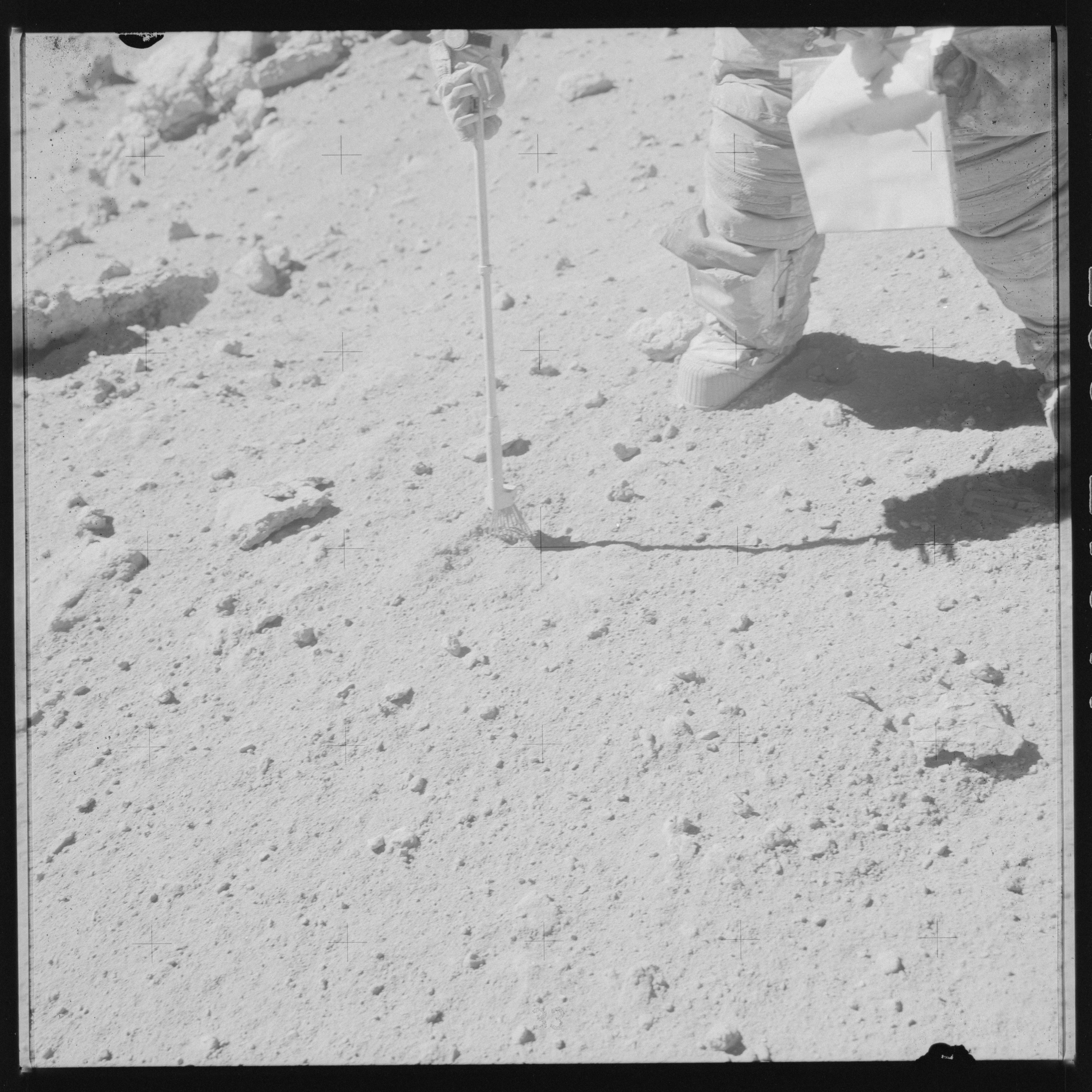
Sample	Sample Type	In Situ Photo	Lithology	Description
67015	rake		breccia	Fragmental matrix breccia, mostly feldspar, but with a wide range of highland lithologies represented as loose clasts in the matrix; have been dated at 3.9 b.y. and the breccias, itself, has had an exposure to cosmic ray of 51 m.y.
67016	rock		breccia	Feldspathic fragmental breccia with both light and dark clasts, and is 3.95 b.y. old with an exposure age of 50 m.y.
67035	rock	-	Fragmental breccia	Very friable, light matrix breccia; was found to be 3.95 b.y.
67055	rock		breccia	Black and white breccia; high trace element content, but has not been dated.
67075	rock		anorthite	Lunar sample 67075 is very friable. Detailed petrographic description showed that the sample may be a mixture of closely related anorthositic rocks from a layered igneous intrusion, and it has been shown to be 4.47 b.y. old, with about 50 m.y. exposure to cosmic rays
67095	rock		impact melt breccia	A glass-coated basaltic impact melt or "bomb" that has not been dated.
67115	rake		breccia	Glass coat is rather thick, but has been fractured and broken off by micrometeorite bombardment
67210 (67215)	rake		breccia	White polymict breccia made up of mostly calcic plagioclase and a few relict lithic clasts and has many zap pits on top and bottom
67230 (67235)	rock		impact melt breccia	67235 is a large special sample that was collected to study the outer surface of a lunar rock
67415	rake		breccia	According to Lindstrom and Lindstrom (1986), 67415 is a lightly-shocked, granulitic breccia with a cataclastic matrix.
67435	rock		breccia	Grey matrix breccias with both dark and light clasts
67455	rock		breccia	Very friable, white polymict feldspathic breccia
67475	rock		breccia	A tough purplish-grey, glassy breccia
67515	rake	-	breccia	Friable, chalky white rock containing lithic fragments of cataclastic anorthosite and feldspathic granulite
67549	rake	-	breccia	Porous and rounded with a light matrix and both light and dark clasts
67556	rake	-	breccia	A friable micropoikilitic impact melt with intrusive glass veins. It has a micrometeorite crater.
67559	rake	-	basalt	Igneous texture indicating that it cooled from a liquid, albeit, highly aluminous. It contains a trace of Ni, Ir and Au and has been dated at 3.76 ± 0.04 b.y., which makes it a critical sample.
67605	rake	-	breccia	Relatively large friable, white particle about the size, shape and color of a golf ball
67627	rake	-	breccia	Glass-cemented aggregates
67628	rake	-	breccia	Glass bombs (renumbered to 4 separate samples 67685-67688)
67629	rake	-	breccia	Glass-cemented aggregates (renumbered to 4 separate samples 67629, 67695, 67696, 67697)
67647	rake	-	breccia	Relatively coherent with many zap pits and has glass clasts, and glass in the matrix
67718	rake	-	breccia	Abundant clasts of plagioclase set in an aphanitic matrix
67729	rake	-	breccia	Vesicular glass breccia with significant clasts, and has the appearance of a "glass bomb". It has zap pits on all sides
67915	rock	-	breccia	Composed of white and grey breccias; both are polymict (Taylor and Mosie 1979), cemented by shock-melted glass and is also cut with thin black glass veins
67935	rock		breccia	Thin veins of black glass, texture of fine-grained subophitic basalt
67936	rock	-	breccia	Thin veins of black glass, texture of fine-grained subophitic basalt
67937	rock	-	breccia	Thin veins of black glass, texture of fine-grained subophitic basalt
67955	rock		breccia	Exterior surface has a thin brown patina with micrometeorite pits; has been dated at 4.2 b.y. with exposure to cosmic rays for ~ 50 m.y. (age of North Ray Crater)
67975	rock		fragmental breccia	Irregularly shaped rock with approximately equal amounts of pale gray, fragmental, friable breccia and a coating of frothy, clast-rich glass.
