= Palmetto (crater) =

Crater on the Moon

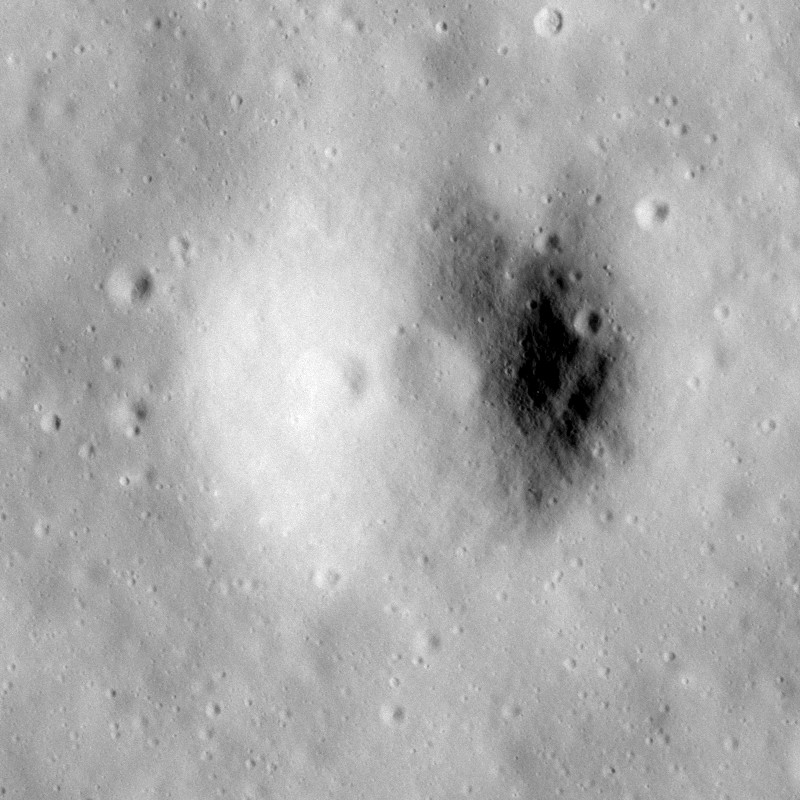
- Apollo 16 image
- Coordinates: 8.92°S 15.5°E
- Diameter: 760 m
- Eponym: Astronaut-named feature

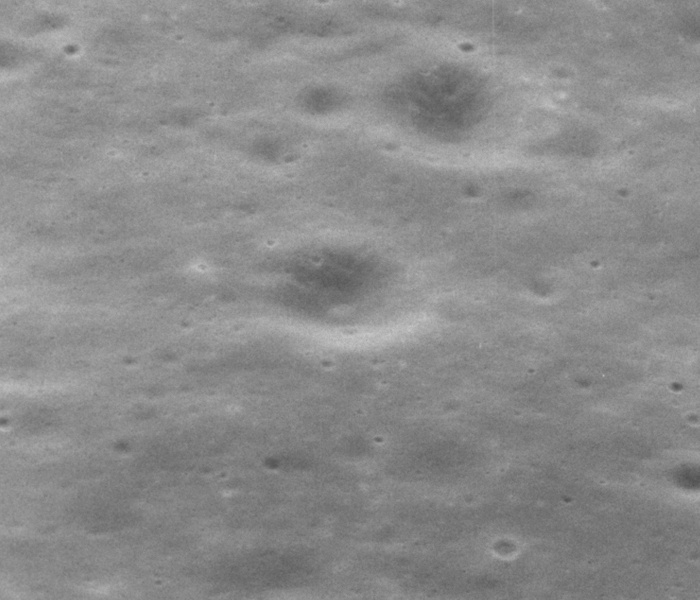
Oblique Apollo 14 image with Palmetto at center and Gator in upper right, facing east

Palmetto crater is a small crater in the Descartes Highlands of the Moon visited by the astronauts of Apollo 16. The name of the crater was formally adopted by the IAU in 1973.

On April 21, 1972, the Apollo 16 Lunar Module (LM) Orion landed about 1.5 km south of Palmetto, which is between the prominent North Ray and South Ray craters. The astronauts John Young and Charles Duke explored the area over the course of three EVAs using a Lunar Roving Vehicle, or rover. They drove along the rim of Palmetto on EVA 3, on their way to North Ray, but did not stop. As they drove by, Duke said "There's a good ejecta blanket of half-meter-size boulders around the rim of Palmetto into some of these secondary craters here." On the way back to the lunar module from North Ray, Duke took a sequence of photos of Palmetto while riding on the rover.

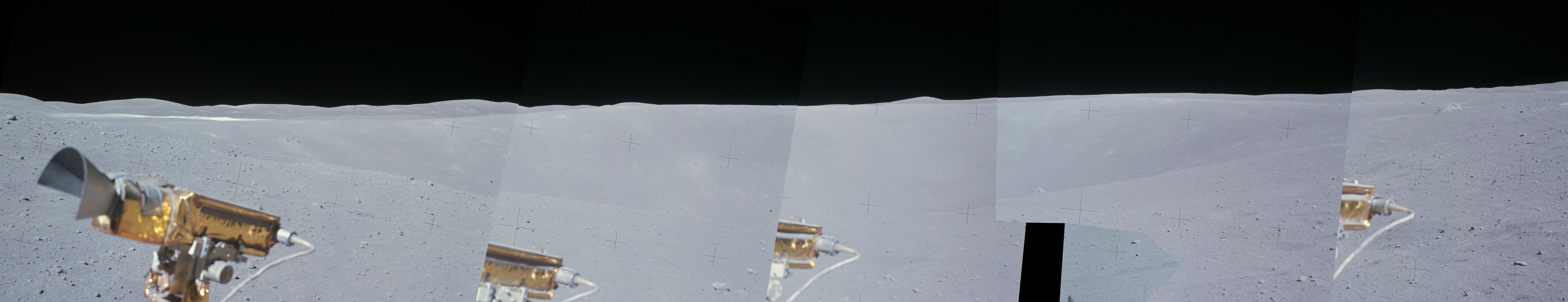
Mosaic showing Palmetto from photographs taken from the Lunar Roving Vehicle on the way from Station 13 back to the lunar module. The bright line near the horizon at left is South Ray.

The crater was also used as a landmark by Apollo astronauts on previous missions. It was designated landmark DE-1/12, and astronaut Dick Gordon tracked it photographically on revolutions 42 and 44 of the Apollo 12 mission.

Palmetto crater is approximately 760 m in diameter and approximately 130 m deep. The similar-sized crater Gator lies 1 km to the southeast.

Palmetto cuts into the Cayley Formation of Imbrian age.
