= Halo (crater) =

Crater on the Moon

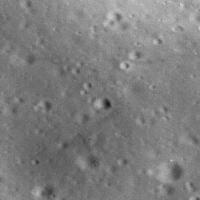
- LRO Narrow Angle Camera image
- Coordinates: 3.02°S 23.42°W
- Diameter: 10 m
- Eponym: Astronaut-named feature

Halo crater is a small crater in Oceanus Procellarum on the Moon. The name of the crater was formally adopted by the IAU in 1973.

Apollo 12 astronauts Pete Conrad and Alan Bean landed the Lunar Module (LM) Intrepid north of Halo crater on November 19, 1969. To the north of Halo is the much larger Surveyor crater, and the landing point is beyond it. To the west of Surveyor is Head crater. To the west of Halo are Bench crater and Sharp crater (now called Sharp-Apollo).

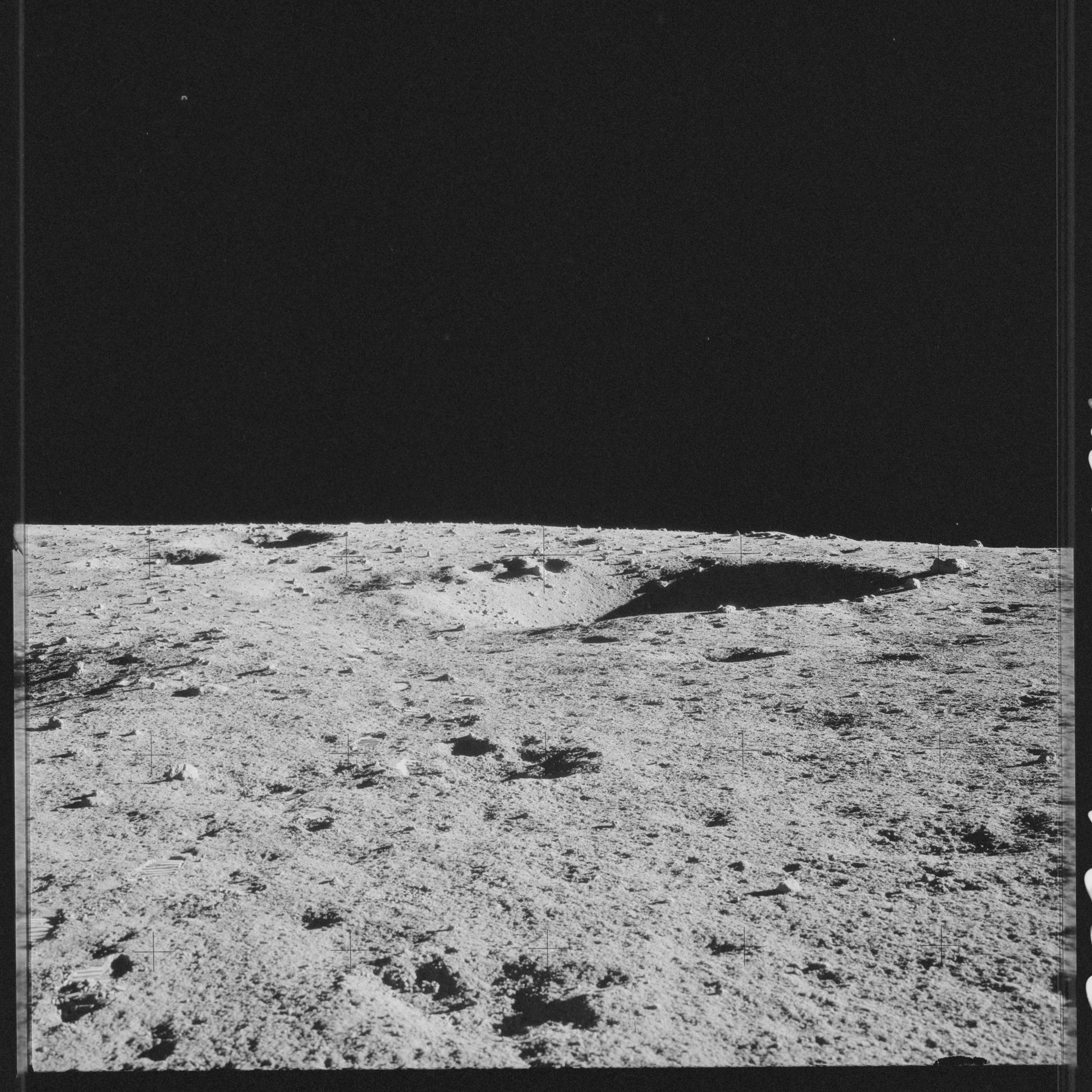
Halo crater from the surface, looking north

== Samples ==
A double drive tube sample was collected south of Halo crater. The two parts of the core tube are samples 12025 (top) and 12028 (bottom).

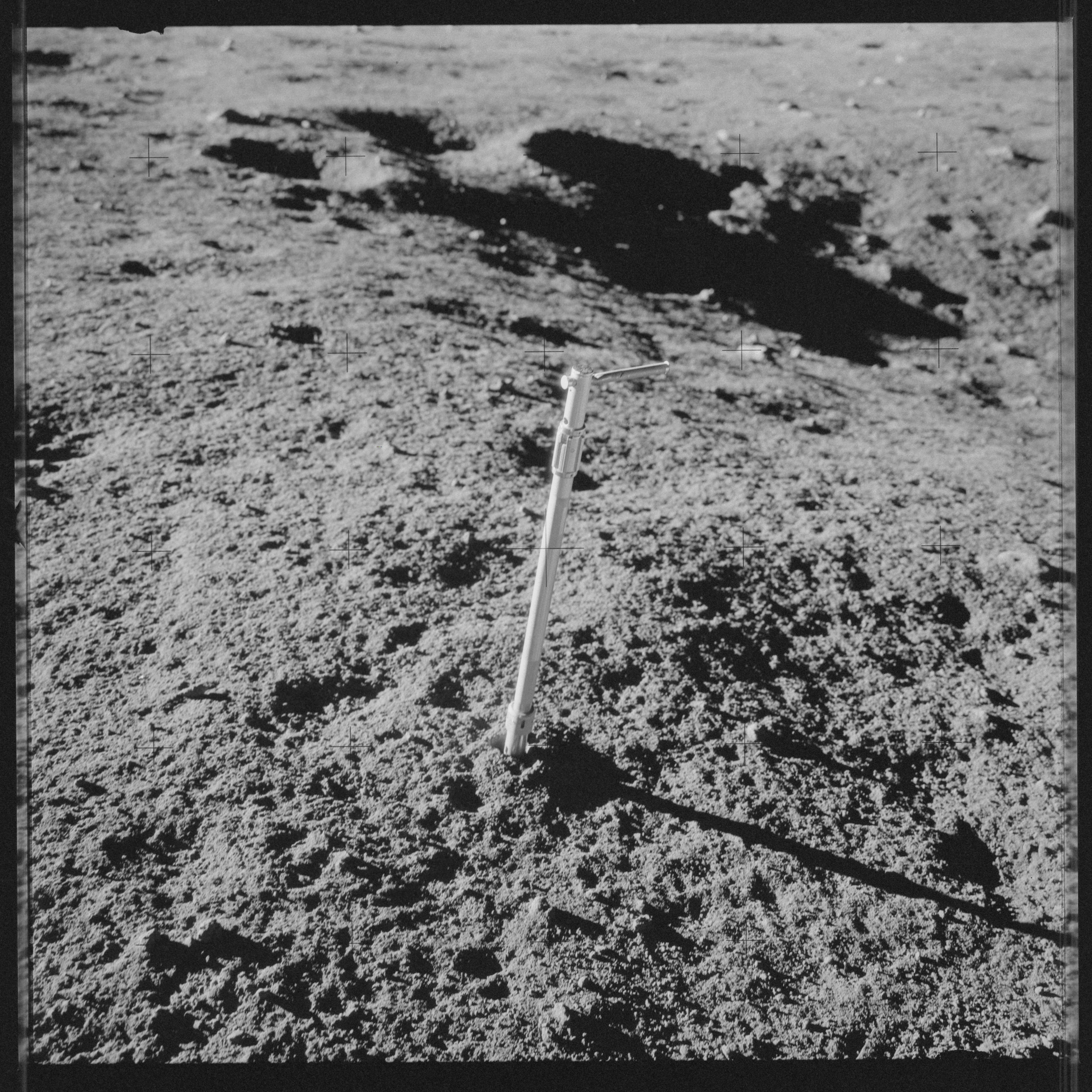
The double drive tube in the soil near Halo crater.

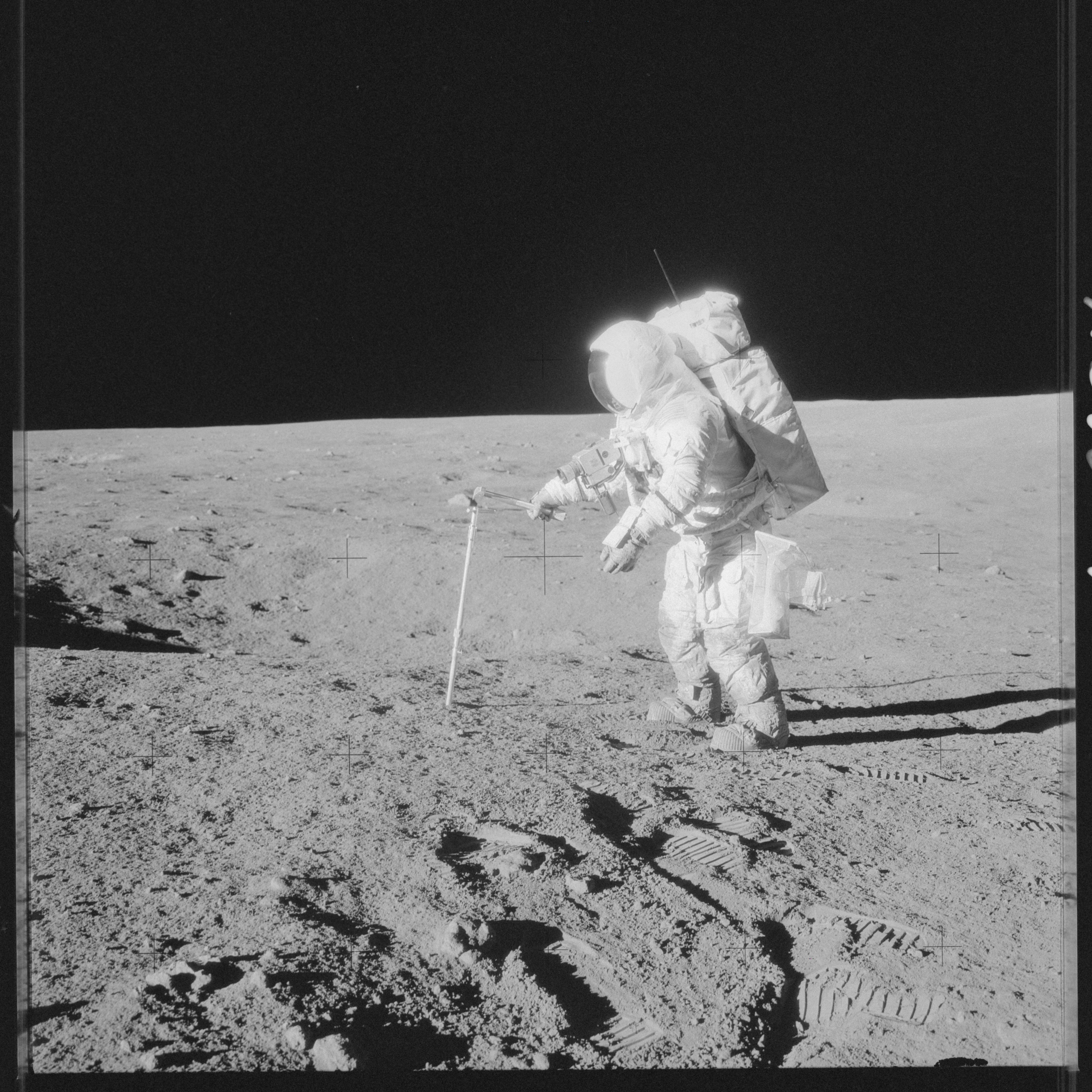
Alan Bean driving the tube into the surface with a hammer.
