= Surveyor (crater) =

Crater on the Moon

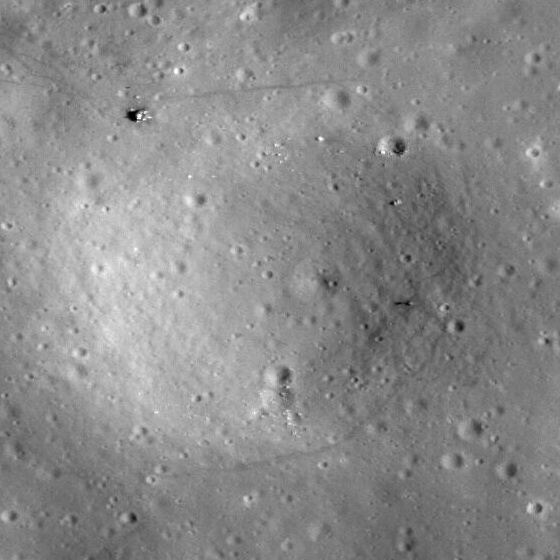
- LRO Narrow Angle Camera image. The Apollo 12 Lunar Module Intrepid is in upper left, the Surveyor 3 lander is on the right side of the crater, and astronaut tracks are visible as dark lines.
- Coordinates: 3.02°S 23.42°W
- Diameter: 200 m
- Depth: 12 m
- Eponym: Astronaut-named feature

Surveyor crater is a small crater in Oceanus Procellarum on the Moon. The name of the crater was formally adopted by the IAU in 1973.

== History ==
On April 20, 1967, the Surveyor 3 spacecraft landed within the crater near the east rim. Surveyor 3 was the third lander of the American uncrewed Surveyor program sent to explore the surface of the Moon.

The Apollo 12 astronauts Pete Conrad and Alan Bean landed the Lunar Module (LM) Intrepid north of Surveyor crater on November 19, 1969, and eventually walked over to Surveyor 3. During their descent, Surveyor crater was a major landmark, and is the largest crater at the landing site. To the west of Surveyor is Head crater. To the southwest are Bench crater and Sharp crater (now called Sharp-Apollo). To the south is Halo crater. A distinct crater on the northeast rim is called Block crater.

Block crater was described in the Apollo 12 Preliminary Science Report:

At Block Crater, high on the north wall of Surveyor Crater, nearly all the ejected blocks are sharply angular, which suggests that the crater is very young. Many of the blocks clearly show lines of vesicles similar in appearance to vesicular lavas on Earth. The blocks are probably derived from the older, coarse blocky ejecta deposit underlying the rim that resulted from the Surveyor Crater event. The regolith at Block Crater may be a meter or less thick.

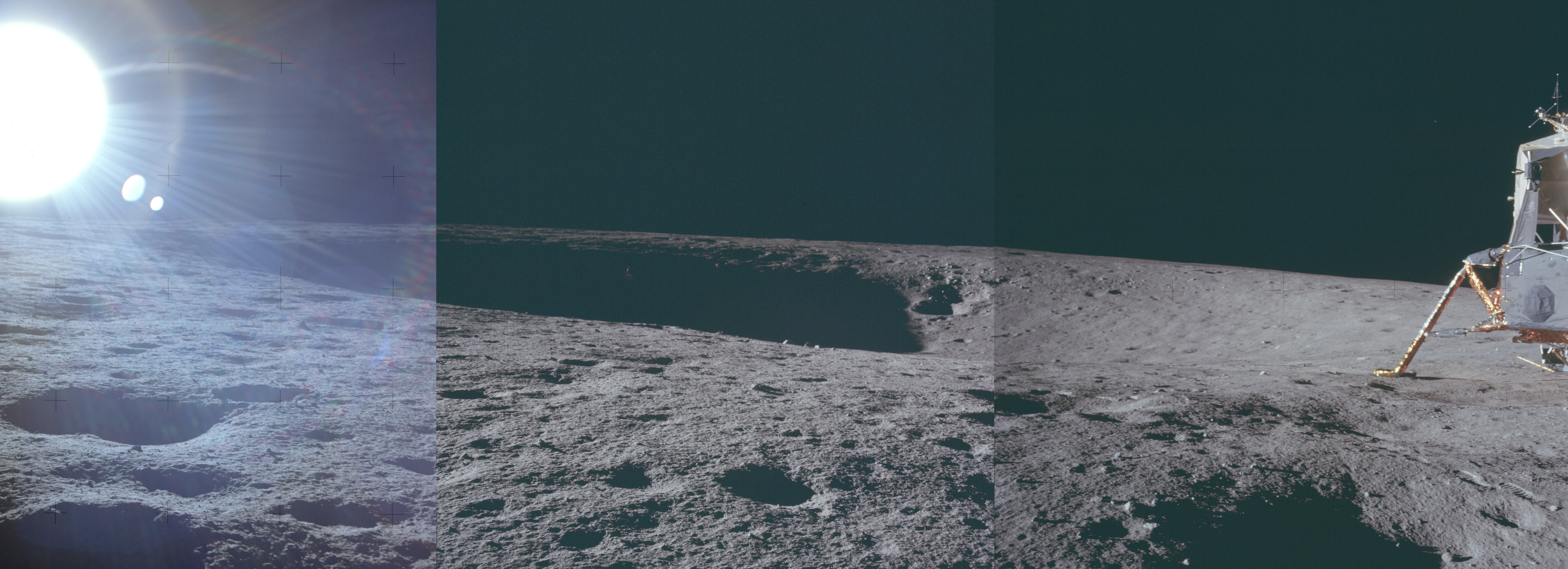
Surveyor crater shortly after landing. The Surveyor 3 spacecraft is in shadow.

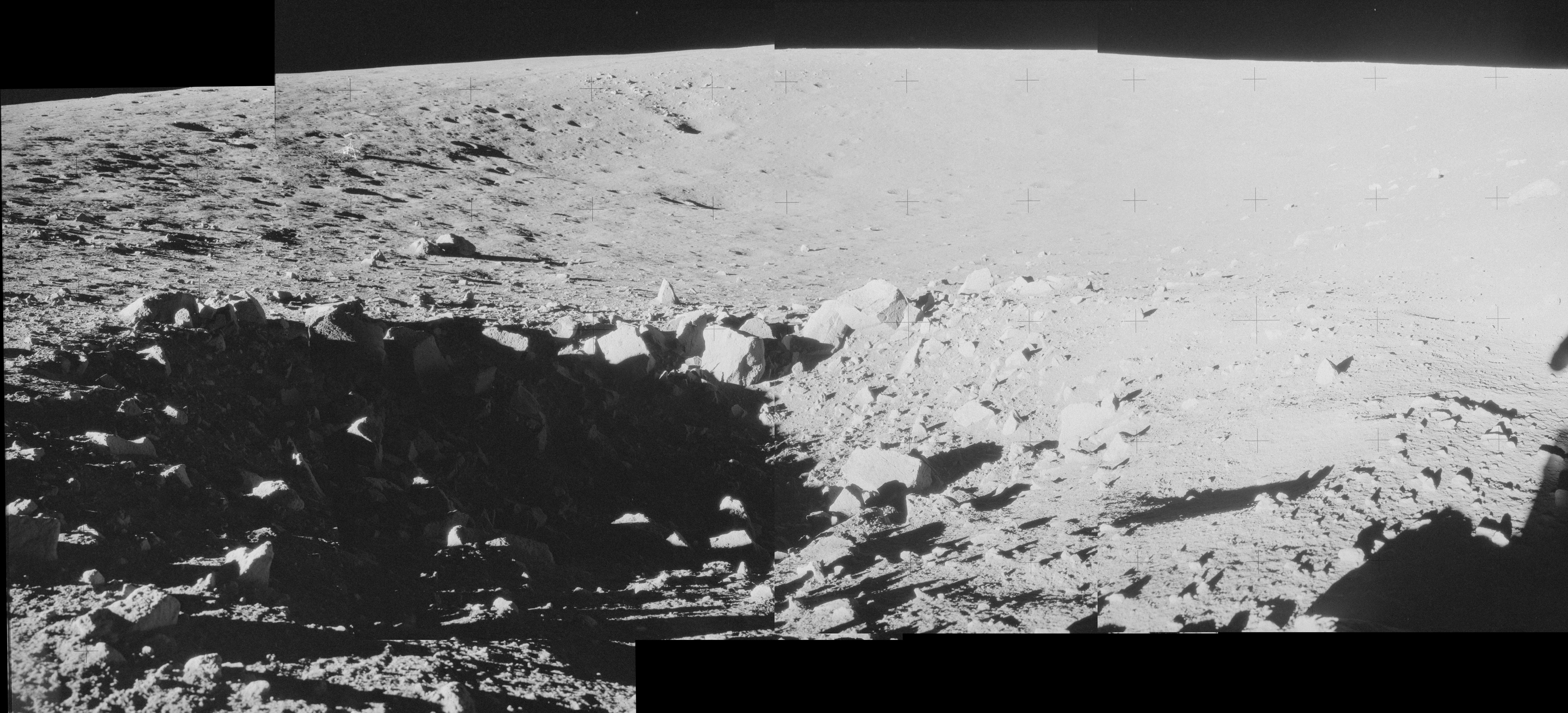
Block crater in foreground and Surveyor crater in background, near the end of second EVA of the mission. Surveyor 3 spacecraft is visible behind Block.

== Samples ==
Many samples were collected in and around Surveyor crater. Samples taken near the LM on the north rim of Surveyor crater include drive tube sample 12026, and contingency samples 12073 (regolith breccia) and 12075 (olivine basalt). Soil Sample 12042 was collected on the southwest rim near Halo crater. Samples 12043 (pigeonite basalt), 12044 (soil), 12051 (ilmenite basalt), and 12054 (glass-coated ilmenite basalt) were collected on the south rim. Samples 12056, 12062, 12063, 12064 (all ilmenite basalts), and 12065 (pigeonite basalt) were all likely collected in the interior of the crater near the east rim and northeast of the Surveyor 3 lander. Samples 12045, 12046, and 12047 (all ilmenite basalts) were collected at Block crater on the north rim of Surveyor crater.

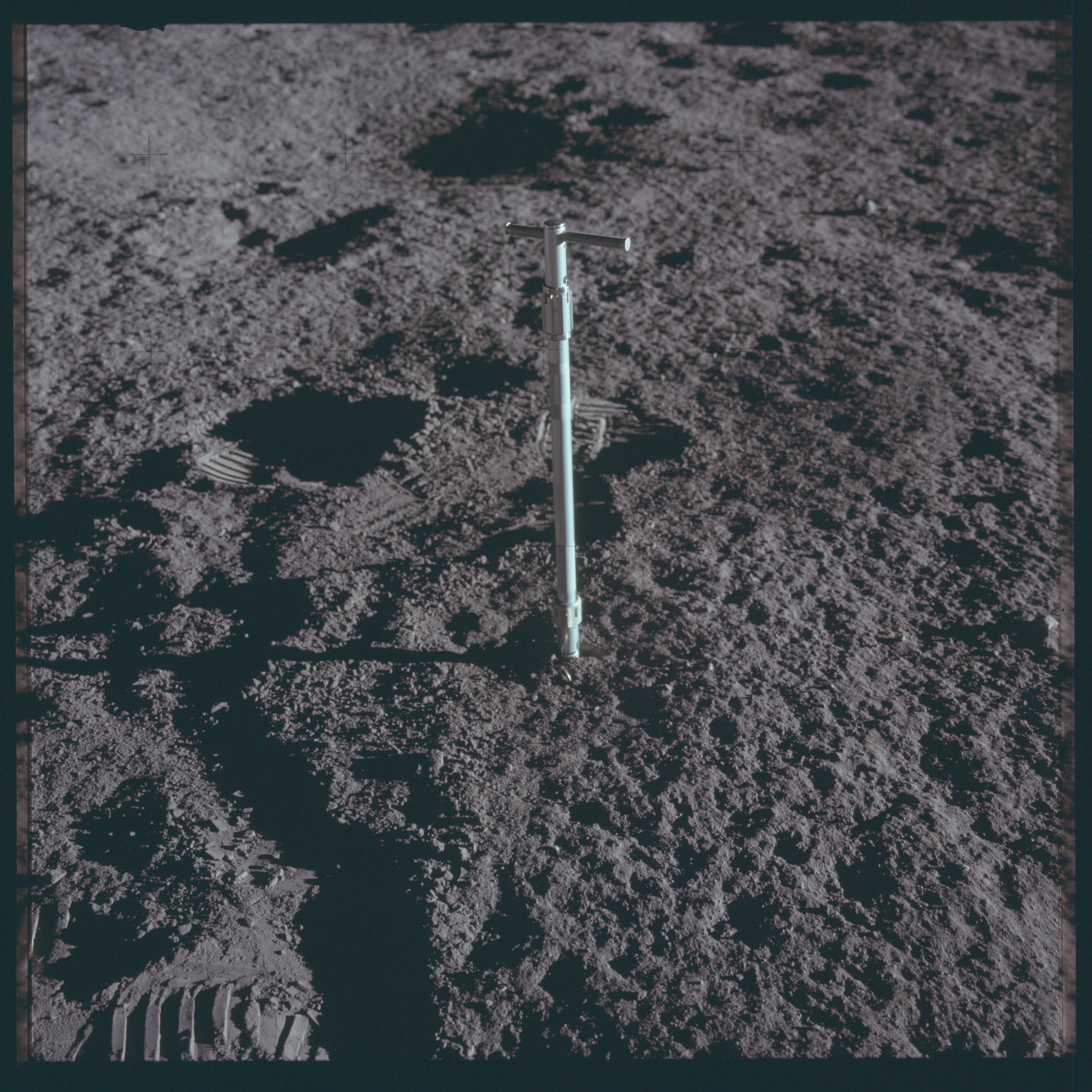
Drive tube sample 12026 in the lunar soil

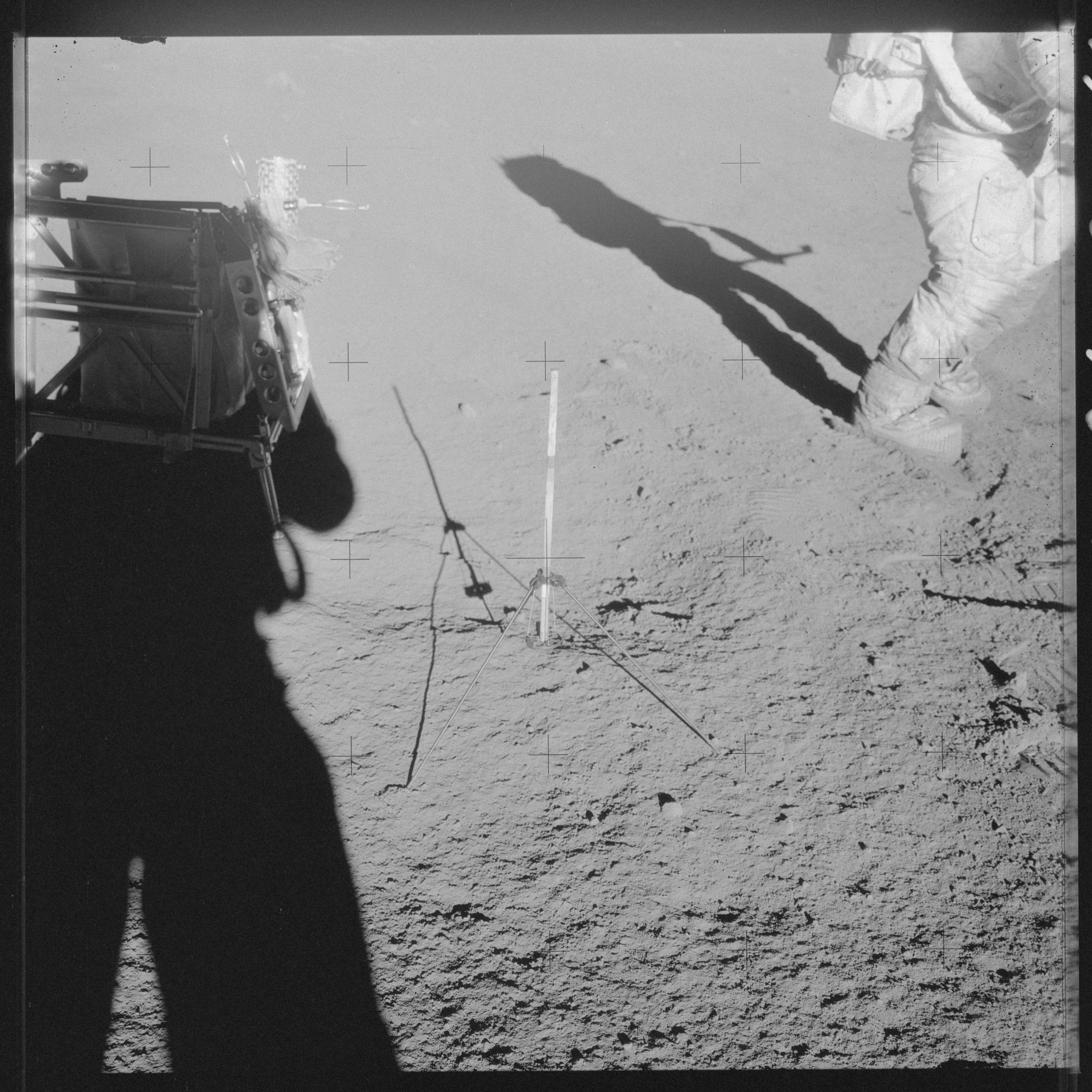
Samples 12043 and 12044

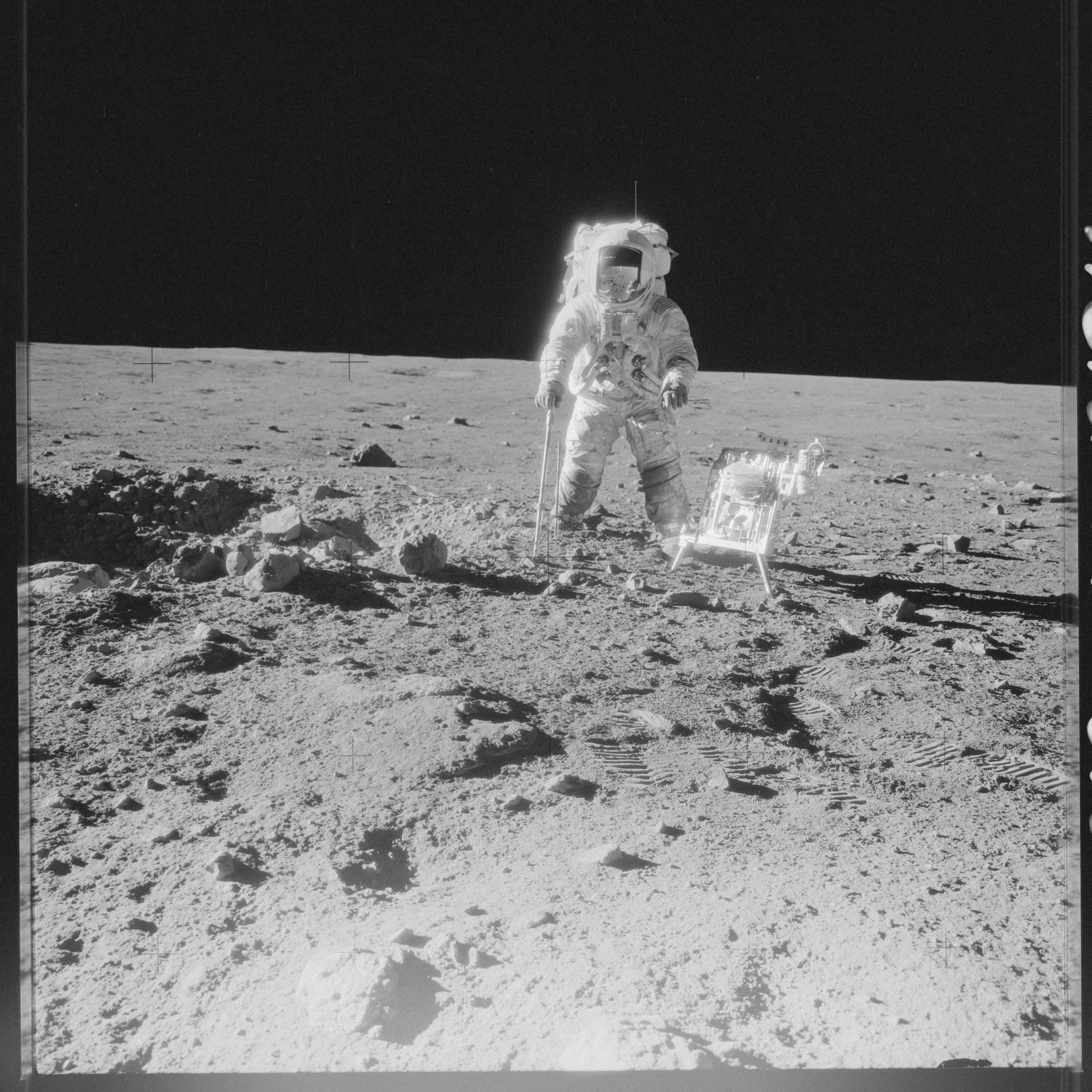
Sample 12051 is in front of Commander Pete Conrad, below the gnomon

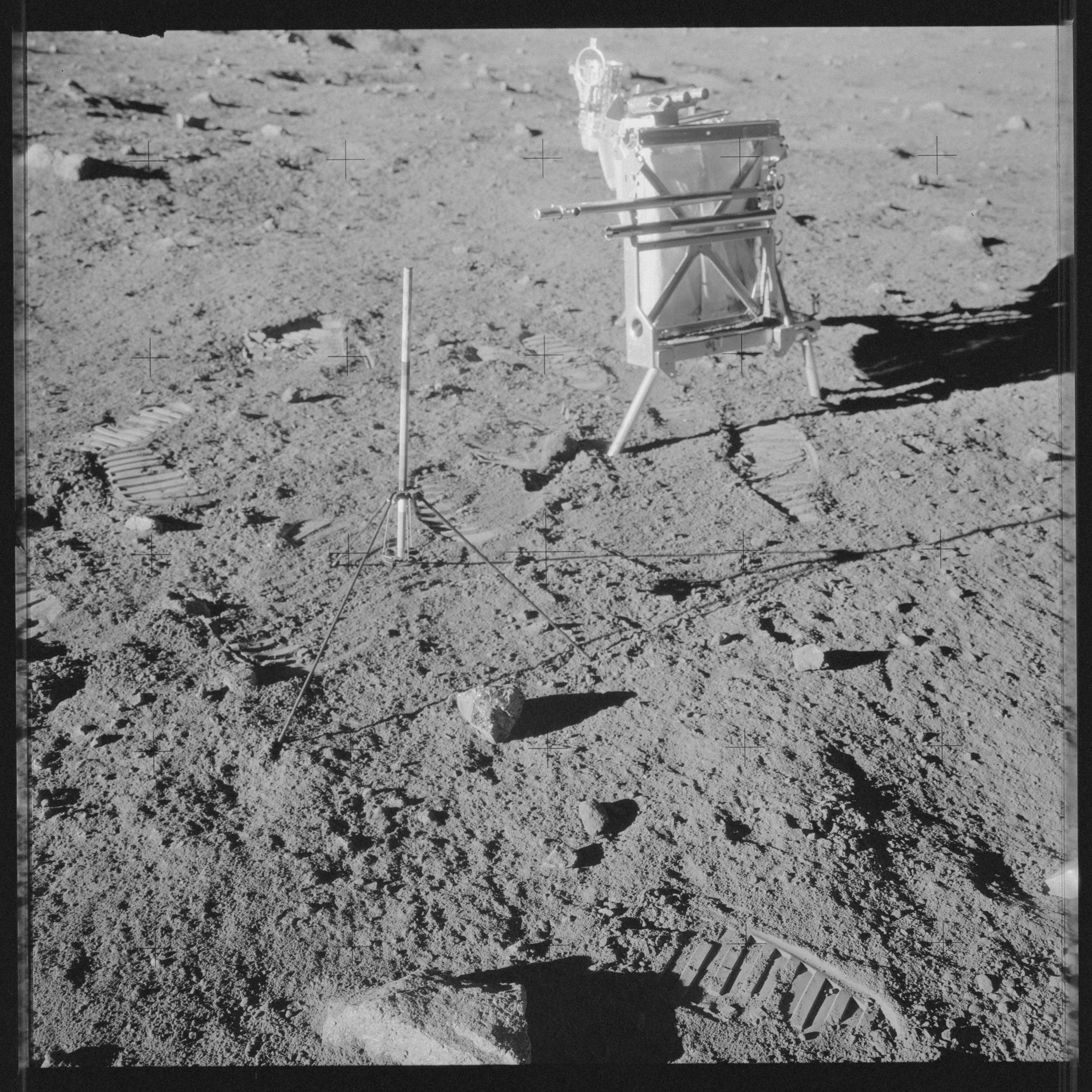
Sample 12054 near the gnomon

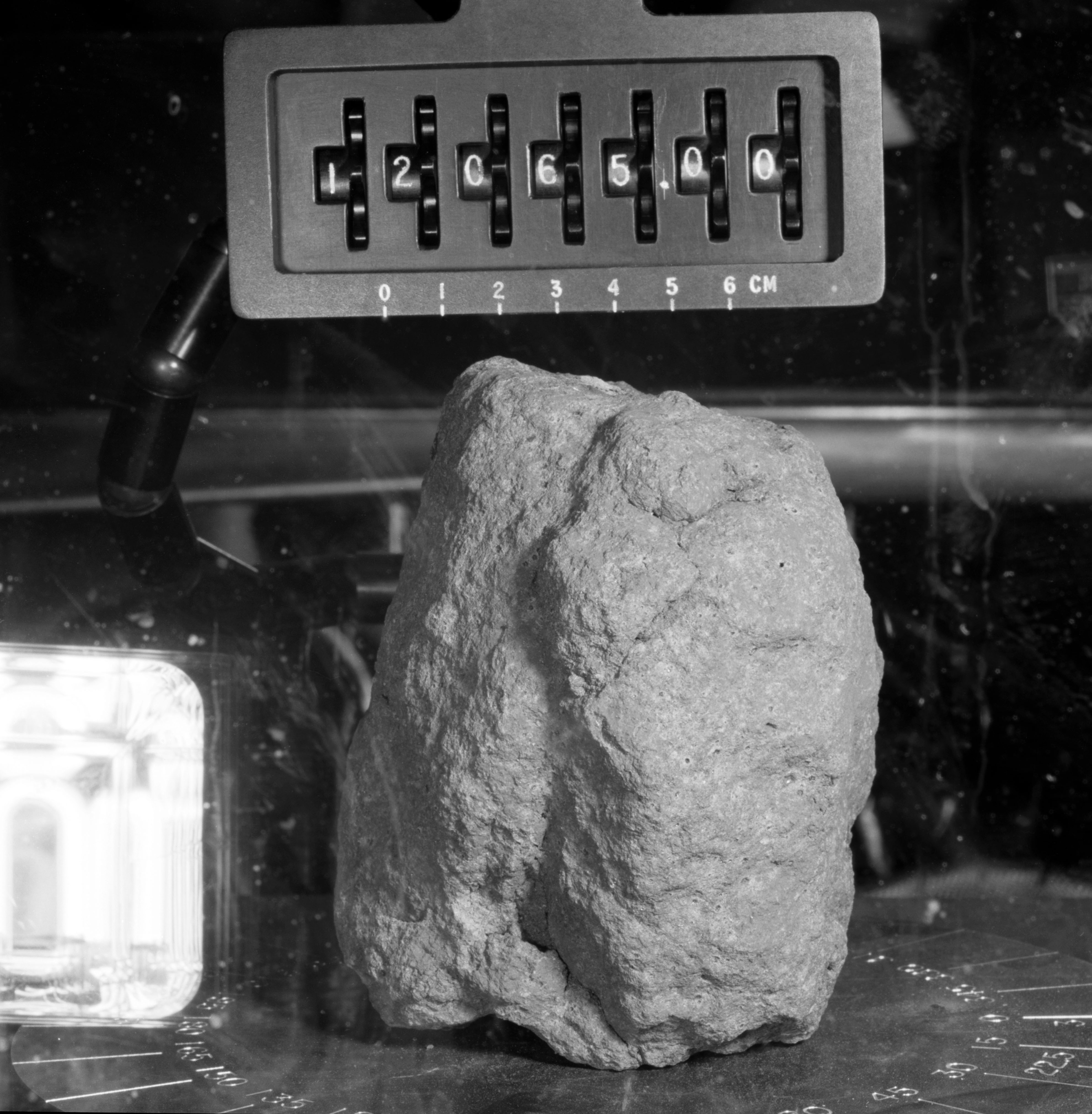
Sample 12065 (pigeonite basalt)

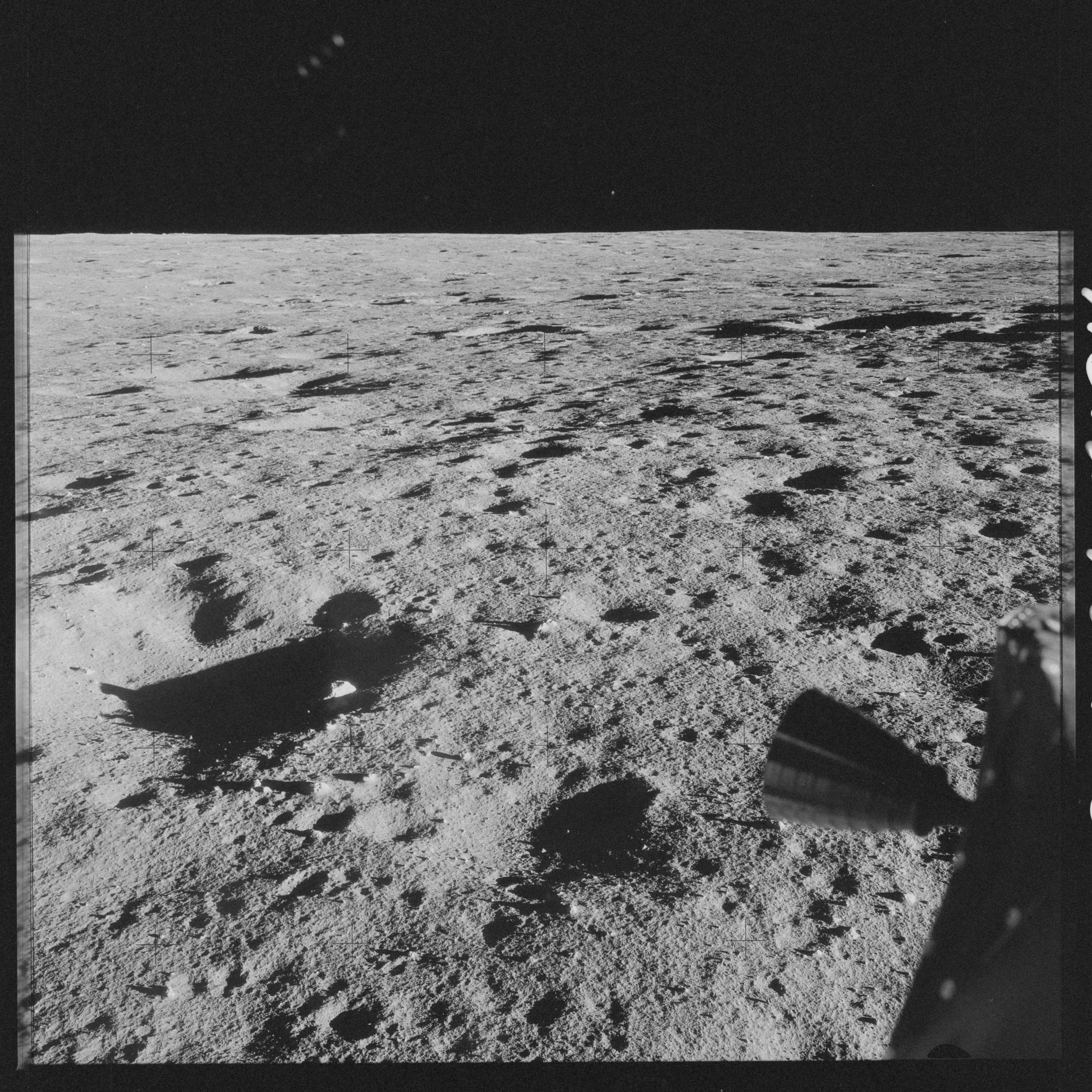
Contingency samples 12073 and 12075 are in lower left
