= Middle Crescent (crater) =

Crater on the Moon

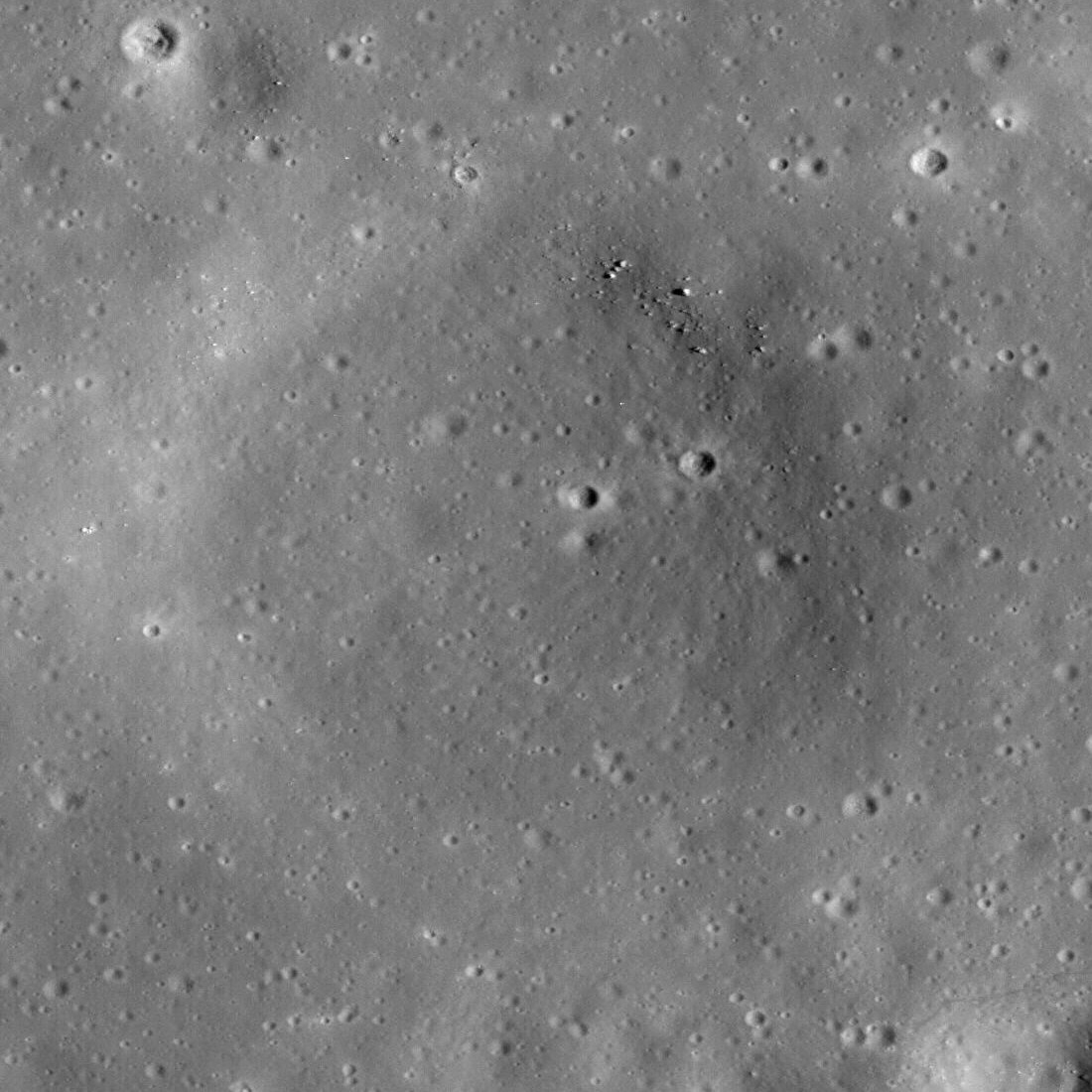
- LRO Narrow Angle Camera image
- Coordinates: 3.00°S 23.44°W
- Diameter: 360 m
- Eponym: Astronaut-named feature

Middle Crescent crater is a small crater in Oceanus Procellarum on the Moon. The name of the crater was formally adopted by the IAU in 1973.

Apollo 12 astronauts Pete Conrad and Alan Bean landed the Lunar Module (LM) Intrepid east of Middle Crescent crater on November 19, 1969. To the southeast of Middle Crescent is Head crater. Middle Crescent is the largest crater visited by the Apollo 12 astronauts.

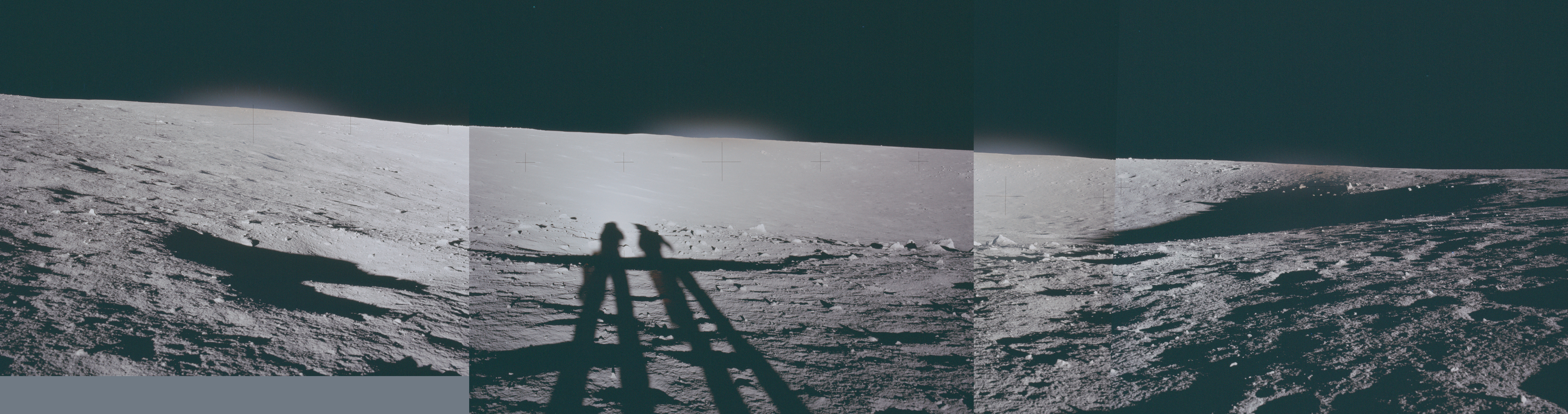
Middle Crescent crater from the surface

The crater was described in the Apollo 12 Preliminary Science Report:

Northwest of the LM is the largest crater visited, the 400-m-diameter Middle Crescent Crater. On looking down into the crater, the astronauts noticed huge blocks on the crater wall, which were probably derived from the local bedrock. Large rock fragments in this crater probably have been exposed since the crater was formed and probably represent the deepest layers excavated at the Apollo 12 landing site.

== Samples ==
Lunar sample 12004, an olivine basalt, was collected at the rim of Middle Crescent. Samples 12014, 12015, and 12016 were probably collected there, but the provenance is less certain. 12014 is also an olivine basalt. 12015 is an olivine vitrophyre. 12016 is an ilmenite basalt.

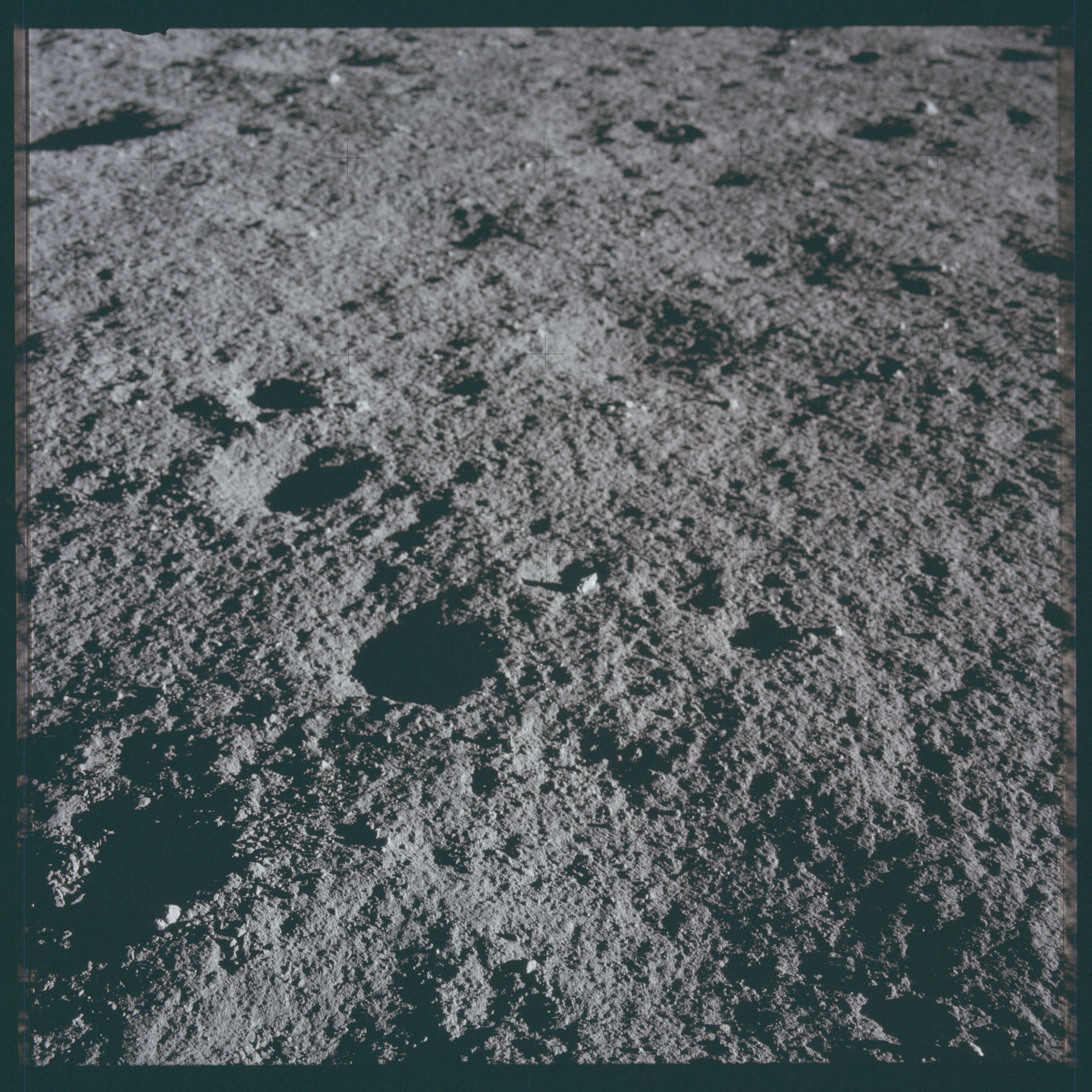
Sample 12004 is at center
