= Bench (crater) =

Crater on the Moon

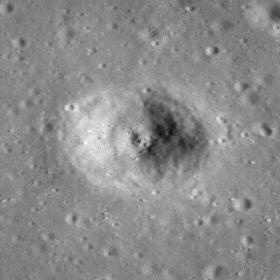
- LRO Narrow Angle Camera image
- Coordinates: 3.02°S 23.43°W
- Diameter: 65 m
- Eponym: Astronaut-named feature

Bench crater is a small crater in Oceanus Procellarum on the Moon. The name of the crater was formally adopted by the IAU in 1973.

Apollo 12 astronauts Pete Conrad and Alan Bean landed the Lunar Module (LM) Intrepid northeast of Bench crater on November 19, 1969. To the northeast of Bench are the larger Head and Surveyor craters. To the west is Sharp crater (now called Sharp-Apollo).

The crater is called Bench because of perceived terraces (benches) within the crater. A wide area on the west side of the crater was referred to as "low bench" and a smaller area on the east side was referred to as "high bench" during mission planning.

The crater was described in the Apollo 12 Preliminary Science Report:

Both rounded and angular blocks litter the surface of the rims of Head and Bench Craters. Some rocks appeared to be coarse grained; to the astronauts, the coarse-grained rock crystals were clearly visible. Many rocks on the rim of Bench Crater were reported to be splattered with glass.

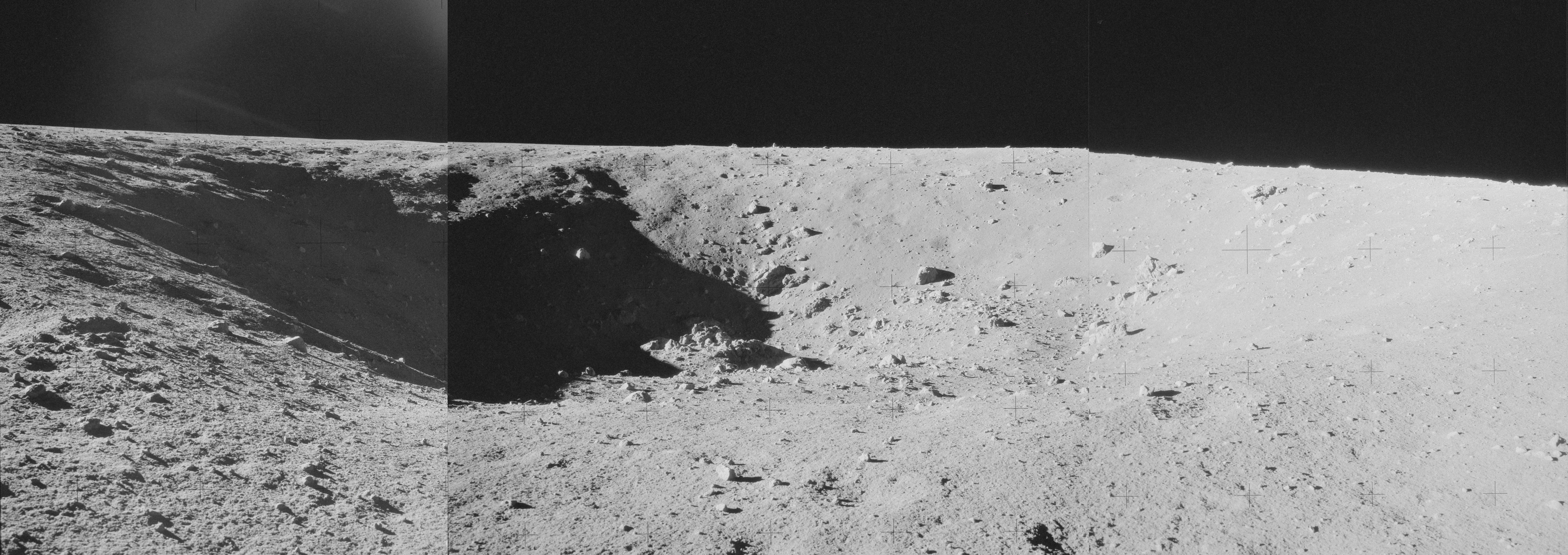
Bench crater from the surface

== Samples ==
Two samples were collected near Bench crater. 12035 is an olivine basalt. 12053 is a pigeonite basalt.

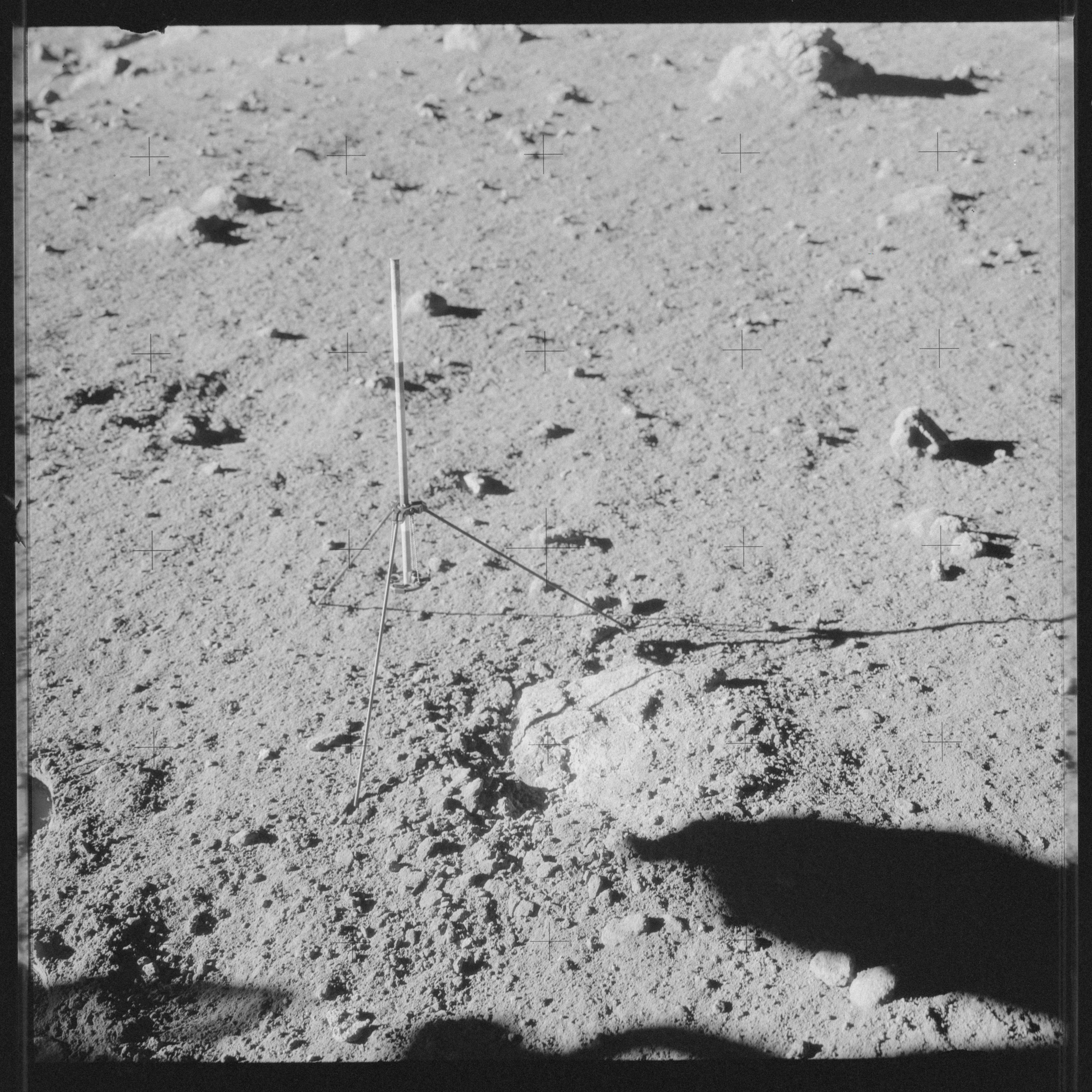
Sample 12035 location.

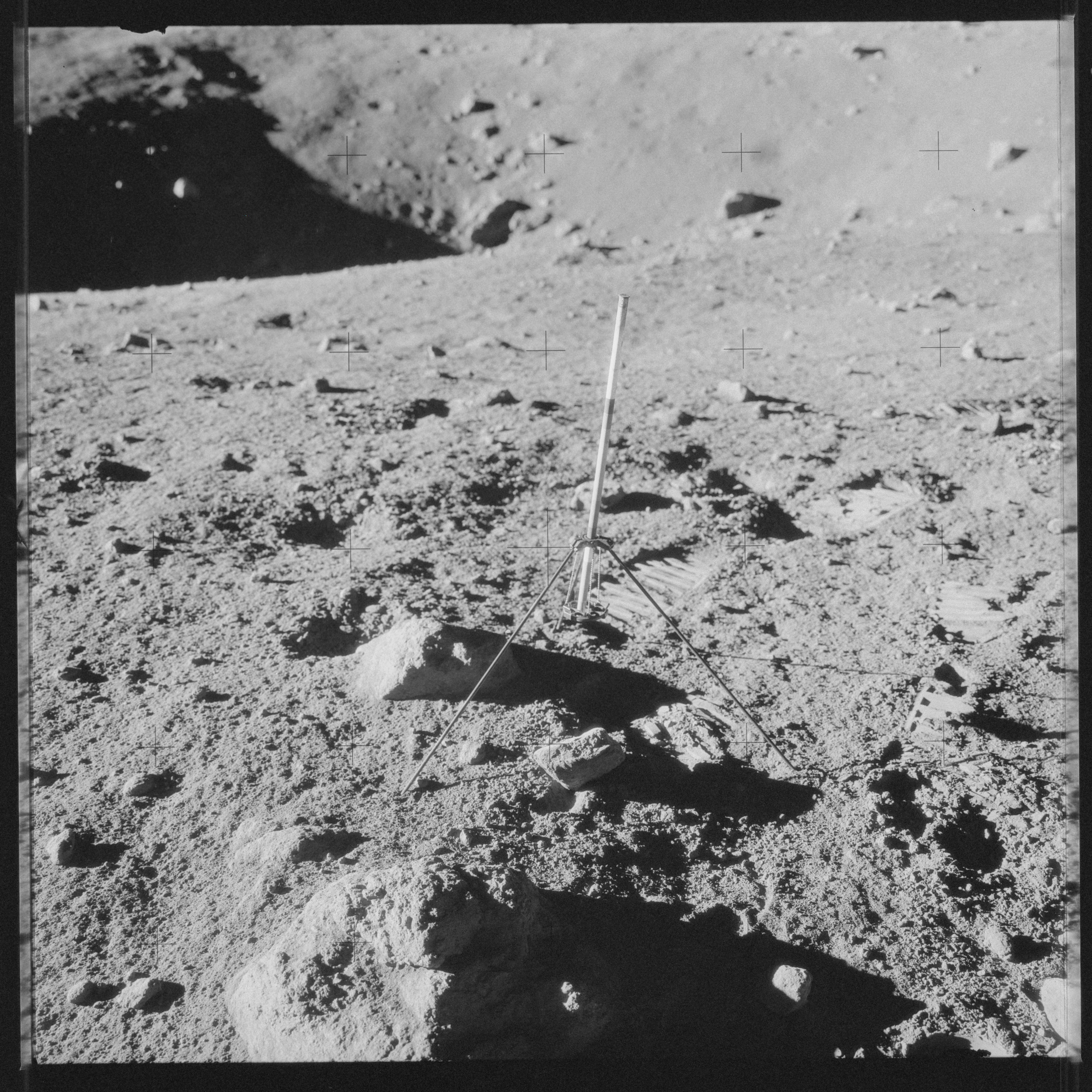
This shows sample 12053, an angular basalt fragment collected from the northwest rim of Bench crater.
