= Head (crater) =

Crater on the Moon

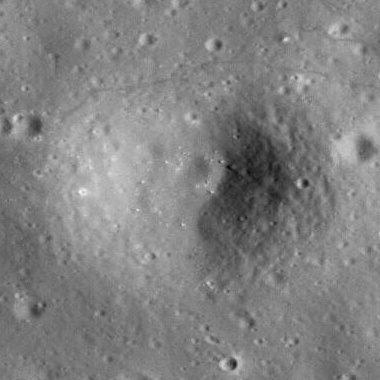
- LRO Narrow Angle Camera image
- Coordinates: 3.01°S 23.43°W
- Diameter: 120 m
- Eponym: Astronaut-named feature

Head crater is a small crater in Oceanus Procellarum on the Moon. The name of the crater was formally adopted by the IAU in 1973.

Apollo 12 astronauts Pete Conrad and Alan Bean landed the Lunar Module (LM) Intrepid northeast of Head crater on November 19, 1969. To the east of Head is the larger Surveyor crater. To the southwest are Bench crater and Sharp crater (now called Sharp-Apollo). To the northwest of Head is the larger crater Middle Crescent.

It is called Head because the pattern of craters in the area resembles that of a snowman (with Surveyor crater forming the body) when viewed from the east, as in the landing approach.

The crater was described in the Apollo 12 Preliminary Science Report:

Both rounded and angular blocks litter the surface of the rims of Head and Bench Craters. Some rocks appeared to be coarse grained; to the astronauts, the coarse-grained rock crystals were clearly visible. Many rocks on the rim of Bench Crater were reported to be splattered with glass.

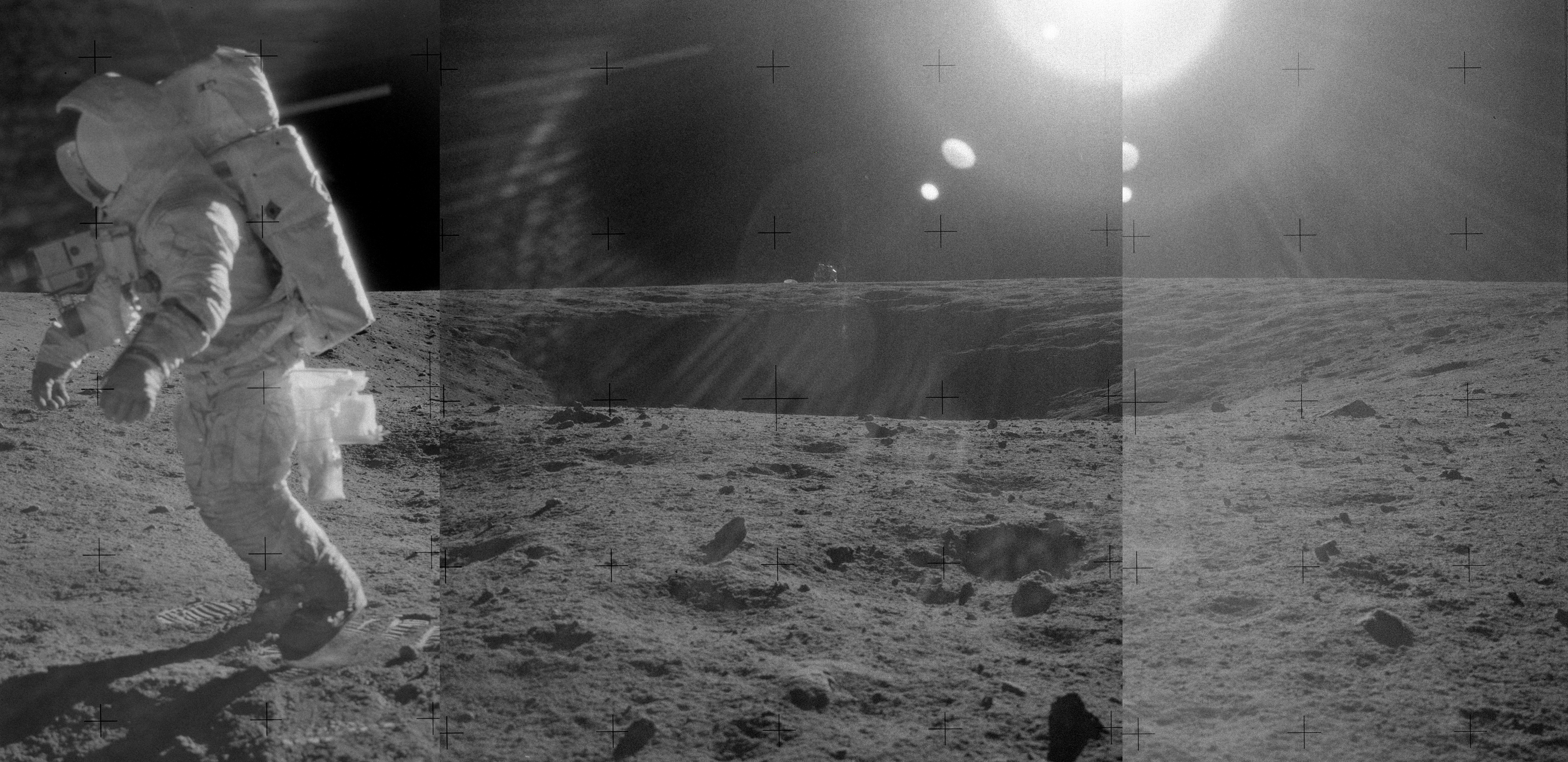
Head crater from the surface.

== Samples ==
Lunar sample 12055, a pigeonite basalt, was collected on the north rim of Head crater. A fragment of sample 12055 is on display at the Cleveland Museum of Natural History.

Sample 12052, another pigeonite basalt, was collected on the west rim.

The crew dug a small trench about 15 m inside the northwest rim of Head crater. Soil samples 12033 and 12034 were collected from it. 12033 is a ropy glass sample that has been suggested came from Copernicus crater and may represent material from the Fra Mauro formation. Sample 12034 is regolith breccia. Its composition does not match the other regolith samples from the site and is presumed to have a distant origin.

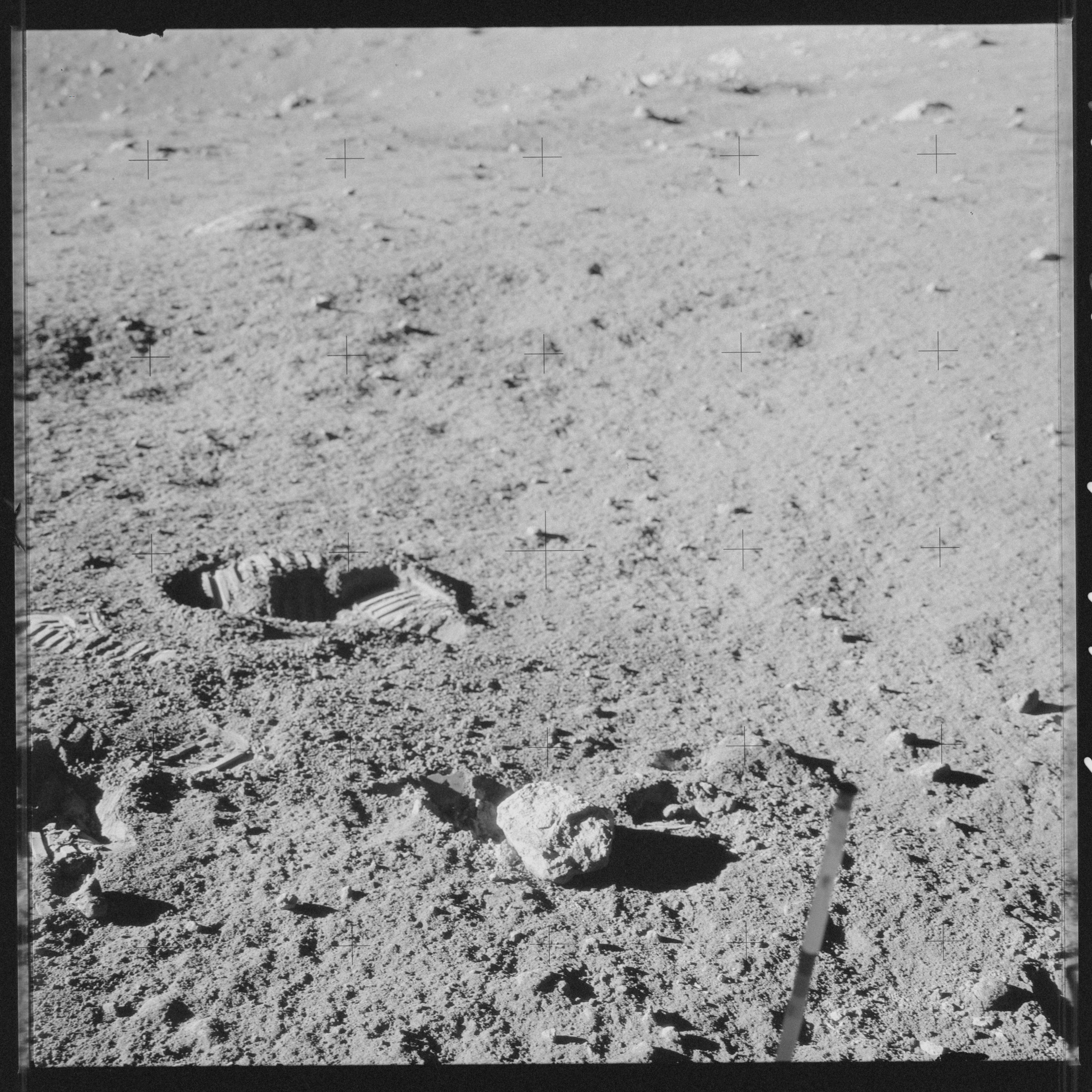
Sample 12055 is below center, on the north rim of Head crater.

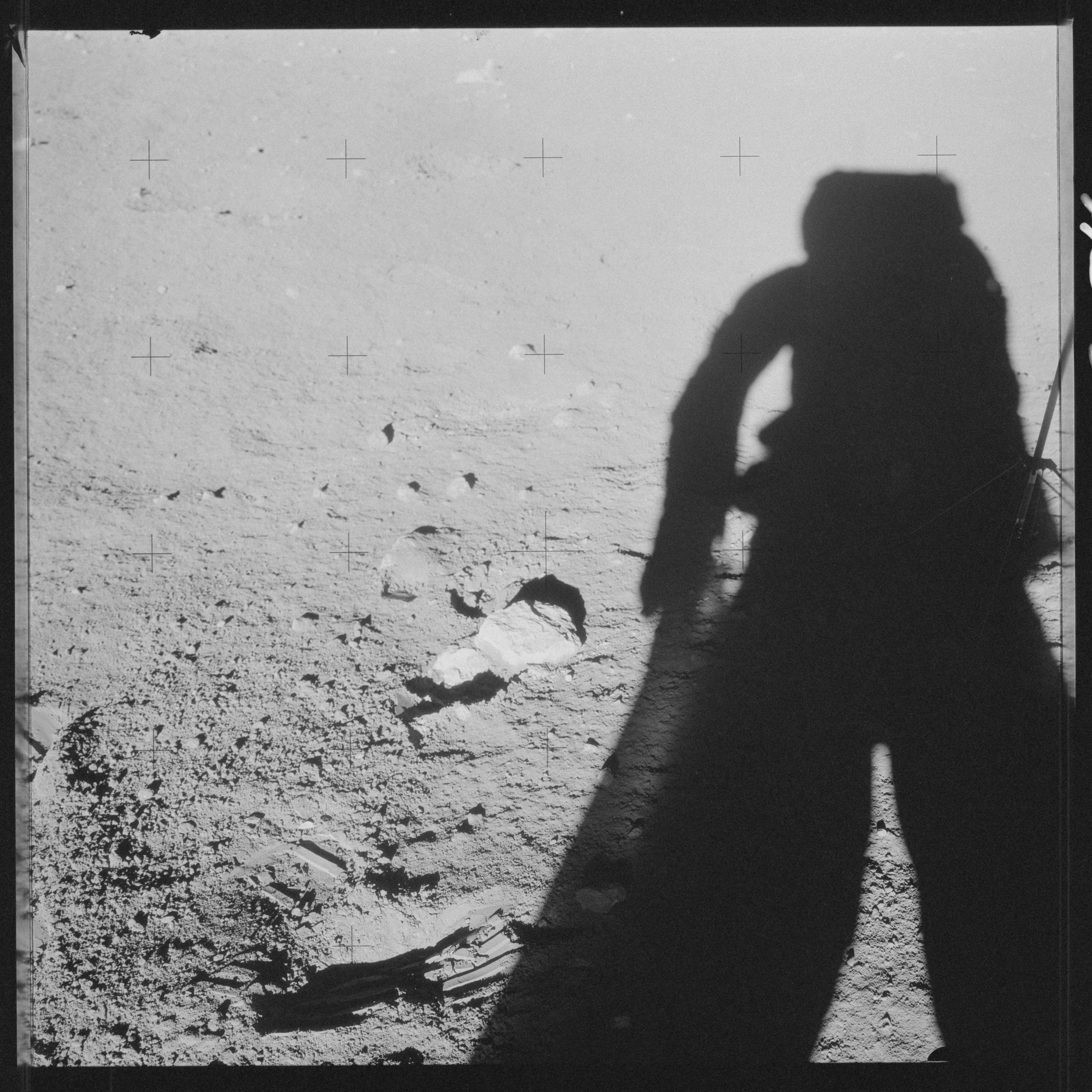
Another view of sample 12055.

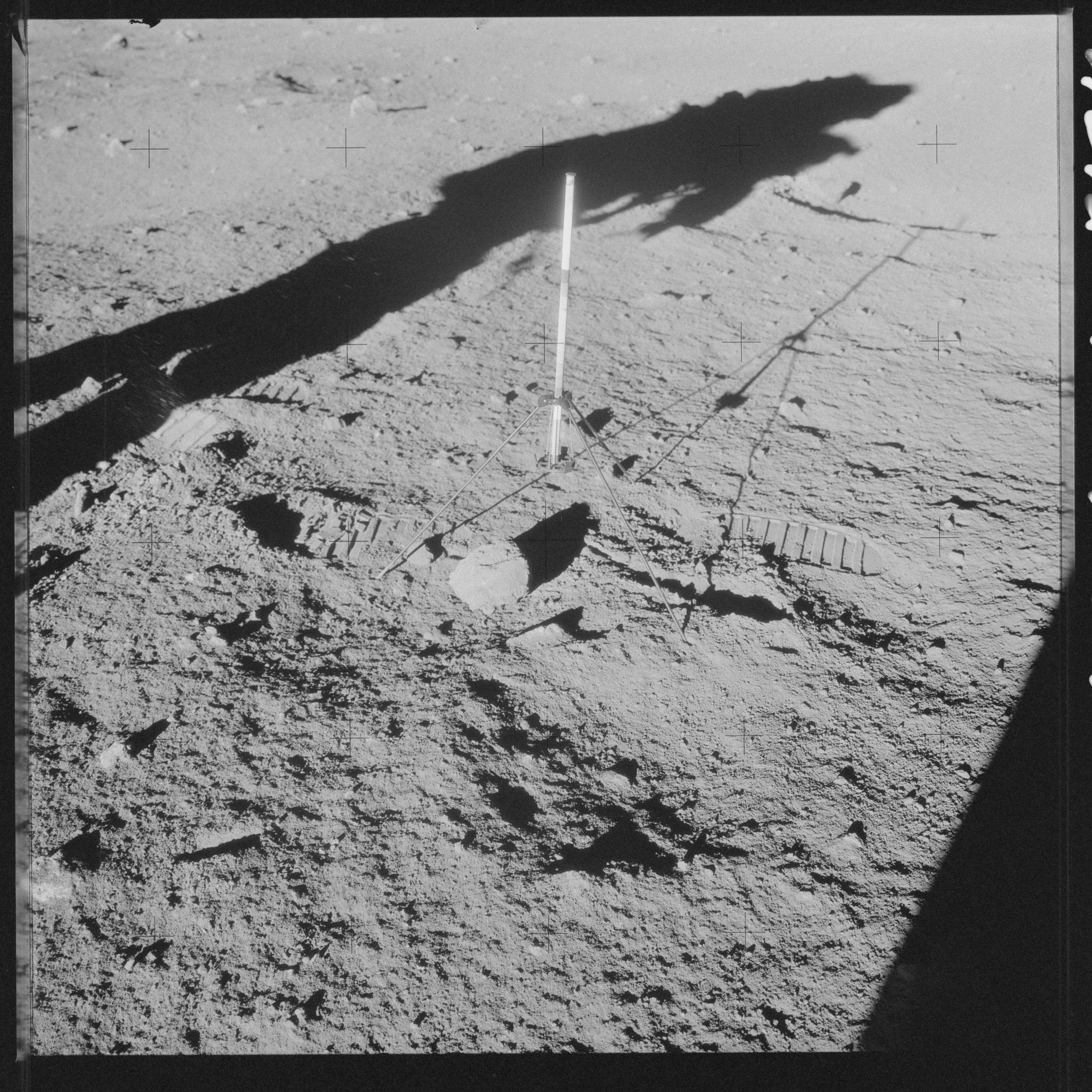
Sample 12052 is below the gnomon, on the west rim.

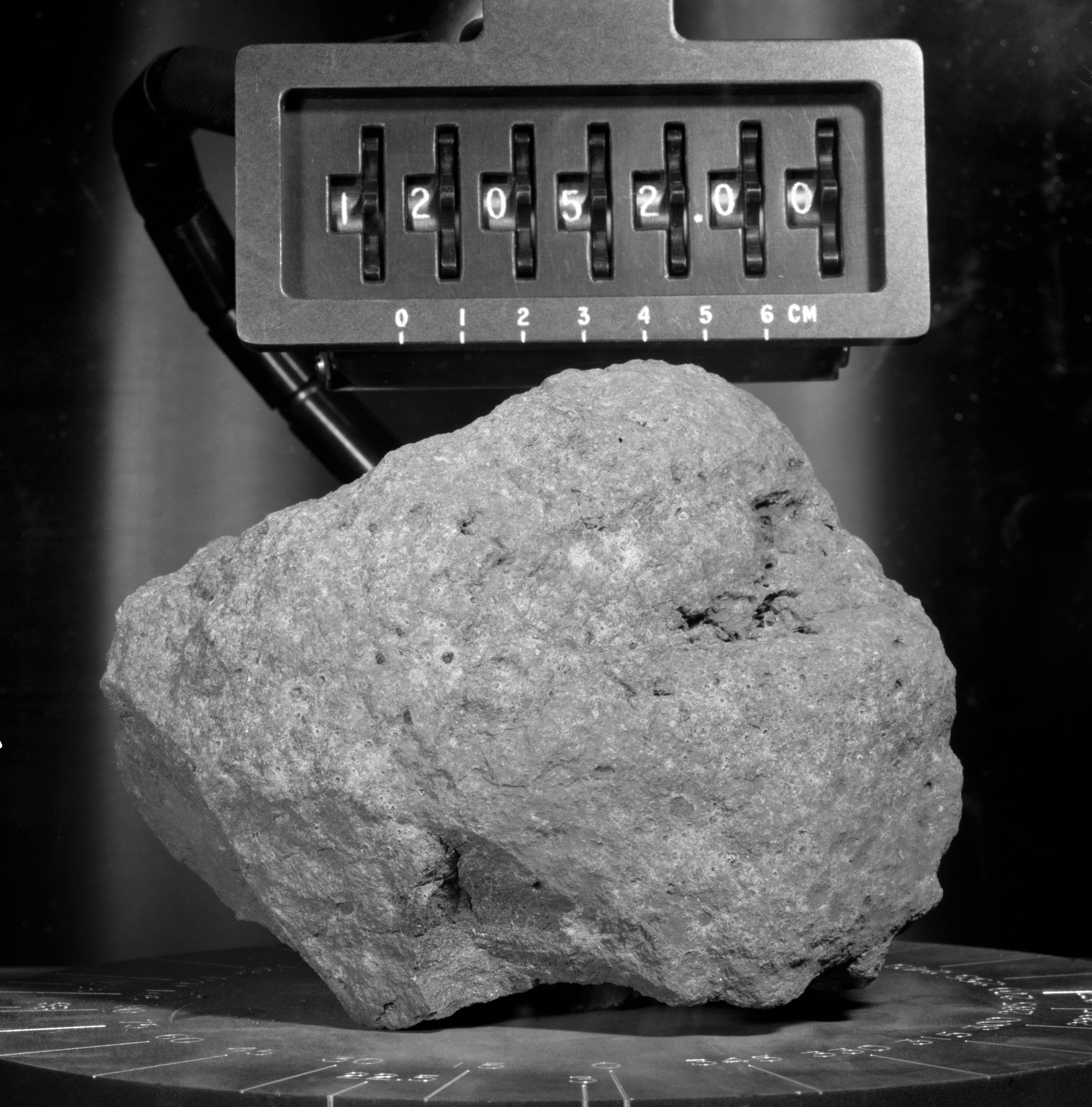
Sample 12052

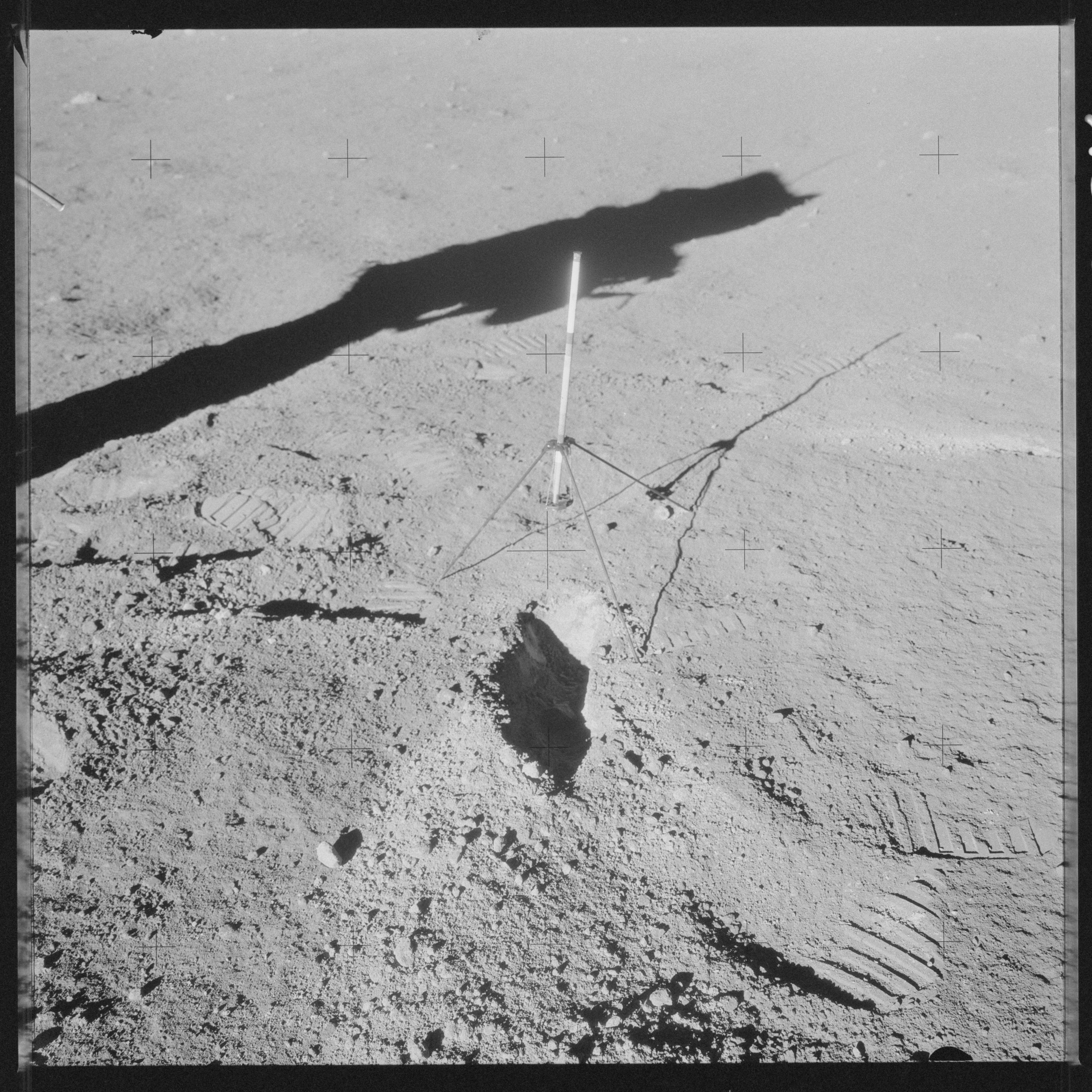
The small trench on the northwest rim of Head crater. Samples 12033 and 12034 were collected from it.

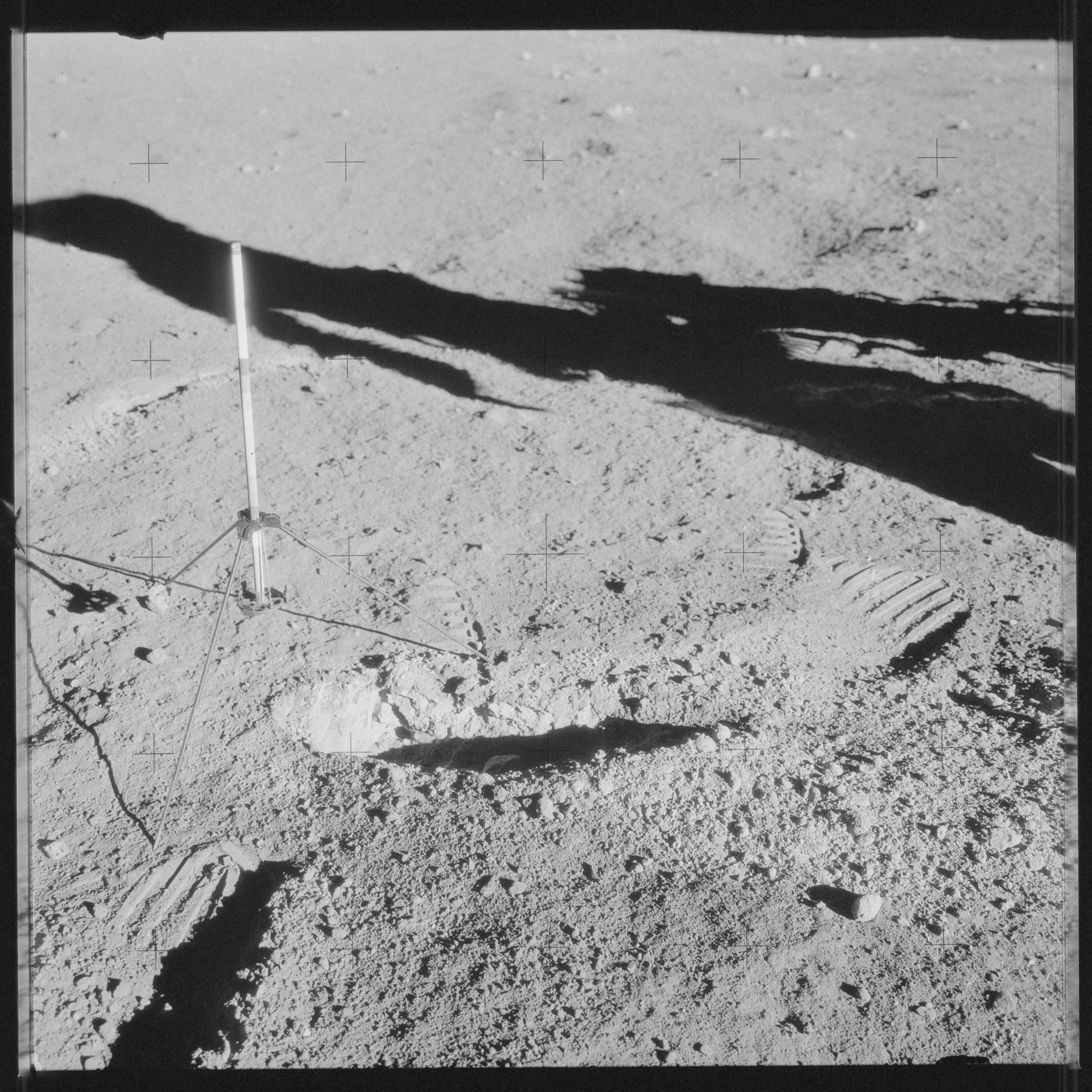
Another view of the trench.

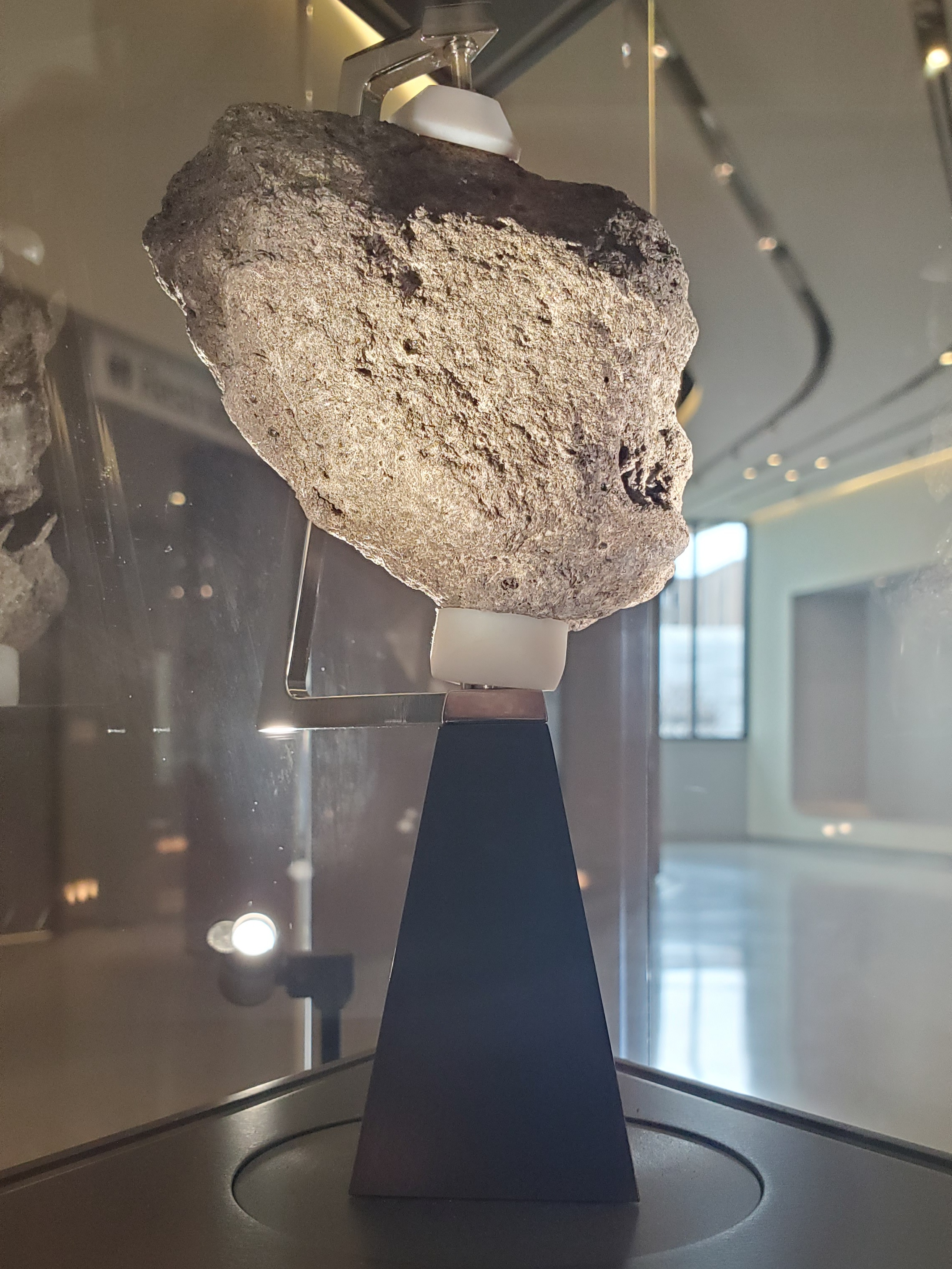
Sample 12055 at the Cleveland Museum of Natural History
