= Sharp-Apollo (crater) =

Crater on the Moon

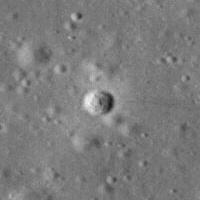
- LRO Narrow Angle Camera image. Astronaut footprints appear as a faint line to the right of the crater.
- Coordinates: 3.02°S 23.43°W
- Diameter: 10 m
- Eponym: Astronaut-named feature

Sharp-Apollo crater is a small crater in Oceanus Procellarum on the Moon. The name of the crater was formally adopted by the IAU in 1973.

Apollo 12 astronauts Pete Conrad and Alan Bean landed the Lunar Module (LM) Intrepid northeast of Sharp-Apollo crater on November 19, 1969. The astronauts simply called it Sharp during the mission. To the east of Sharp is the larger Bench crater. More distant and to the northeast are Head and Surveyor craters.

The crater was described in the Apollo 12 Preliminary Science Report:

Sharp Crater has a rim 0.66 m high that is composed of material with high albedo. This material has been splashed out radially around the crater and is softer than the normal regolith. A core tube driven into the rim of the crater penetrated the ejecta without difficulty. Samples collected near the center may show the youngest exposure ages. Sharp Crater appears to have just barely penetrated the regolith. A terrace near the crater floor is probably controlled by the subregolith bedrock at a depth of approximately 3 m.

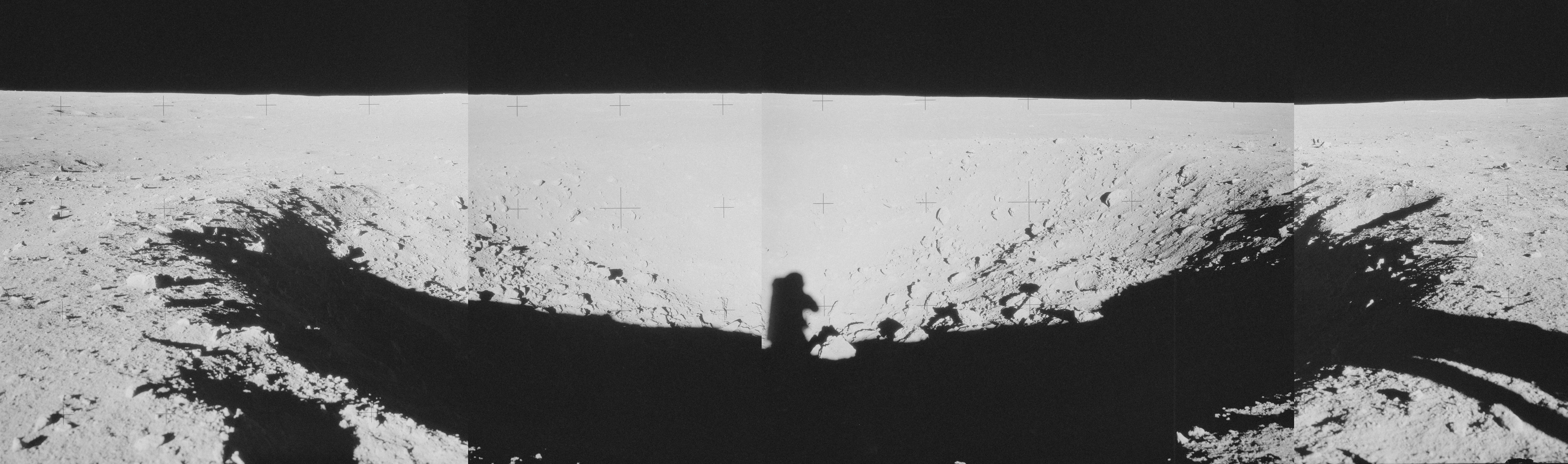
Sharp-Apollo crater from the surface, looking west.

== Samples ==
Conrad and Bean excavated a small trench on the east side of Sharp crater. They collected two special samples and a drive tube sample from the trench. 12023 was collected with a Lunar Environment Sample Container (LESC) from the bottom of the trench. 12024 was collected in a Gas Analysis Sample Container (GASC) from the top of the trench. The drive tube, 12027, was collected from the bottom of the trench after sample 12023.

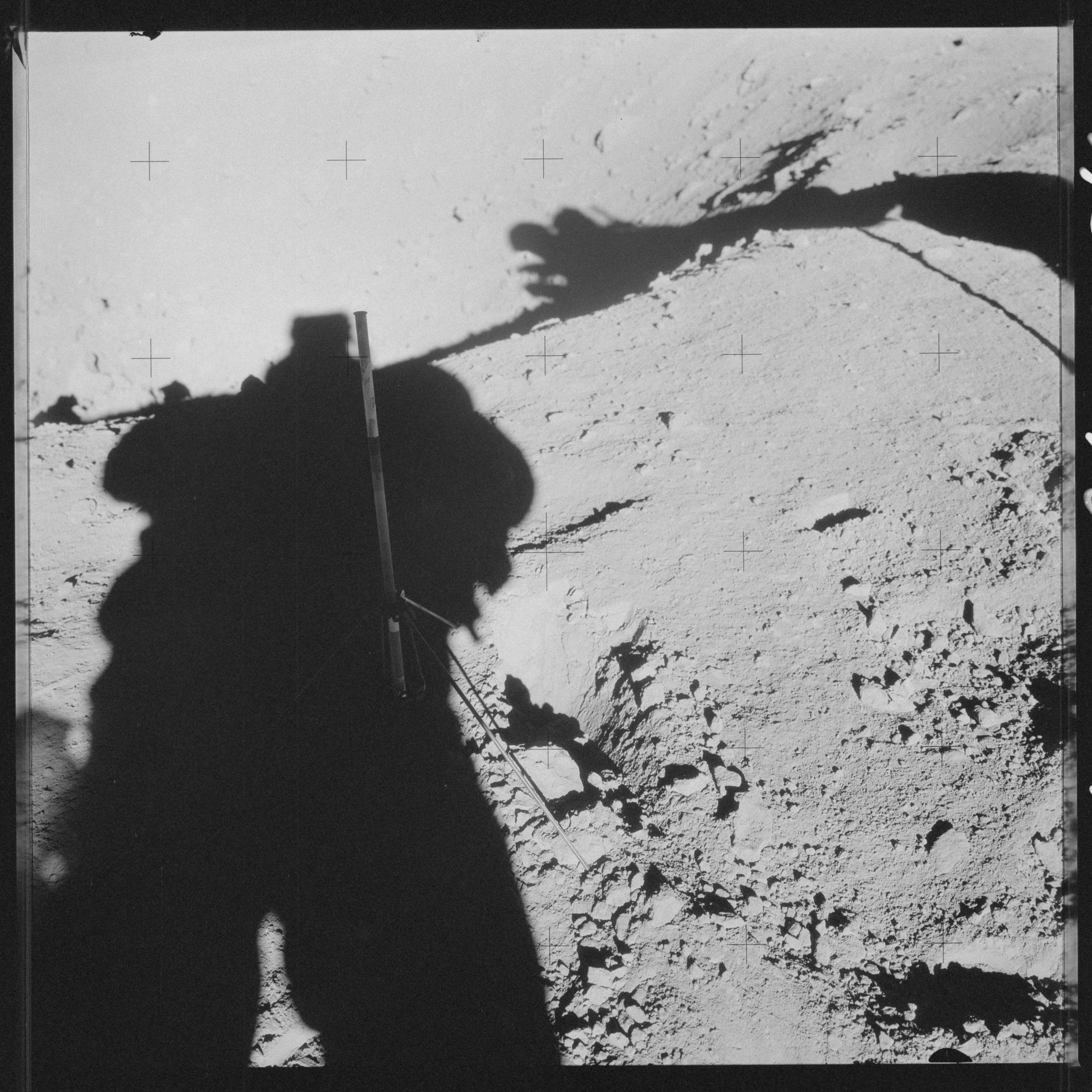
Trench dug on the east rim of Sharp crater.

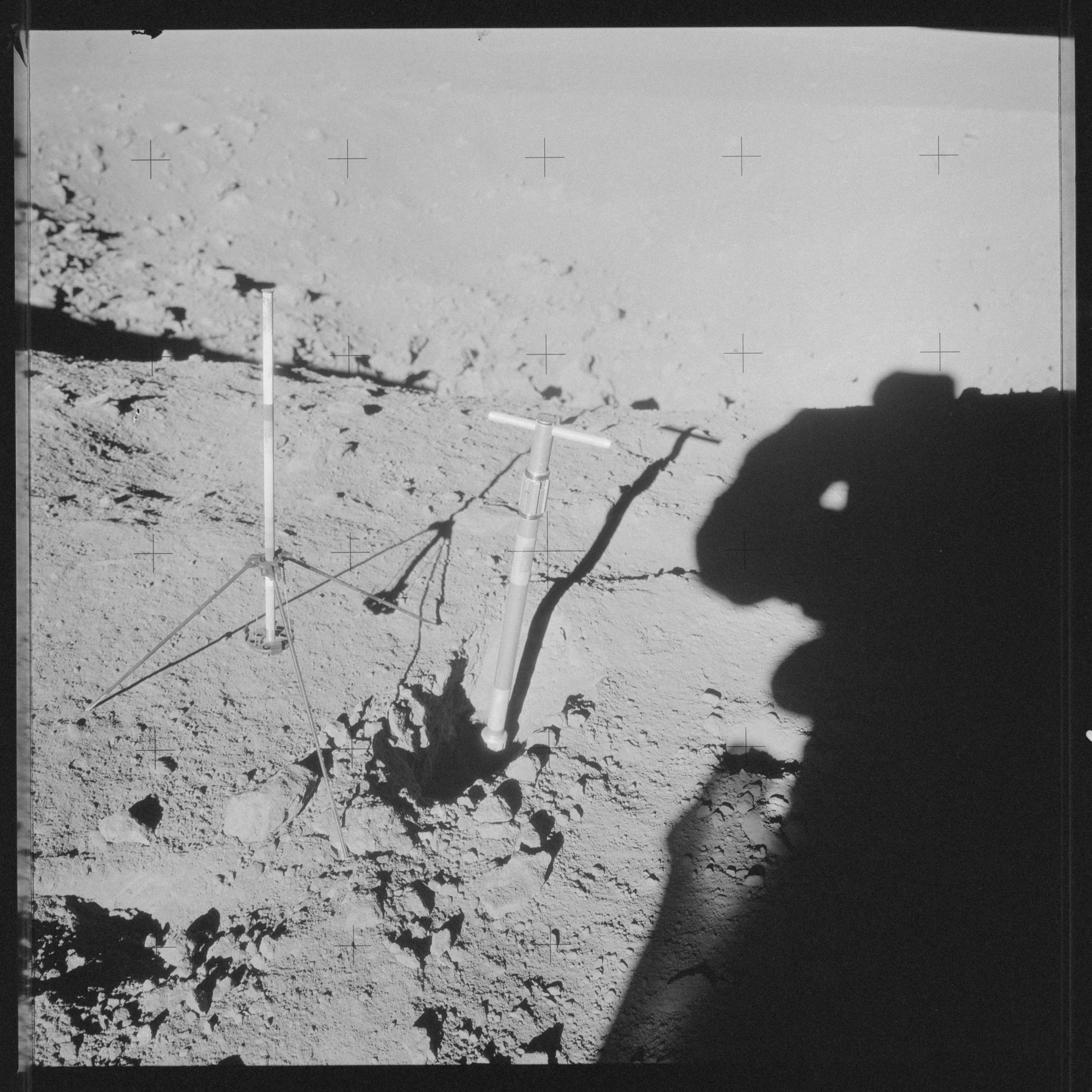
Drive tube, sample 12027, in place in the trench.

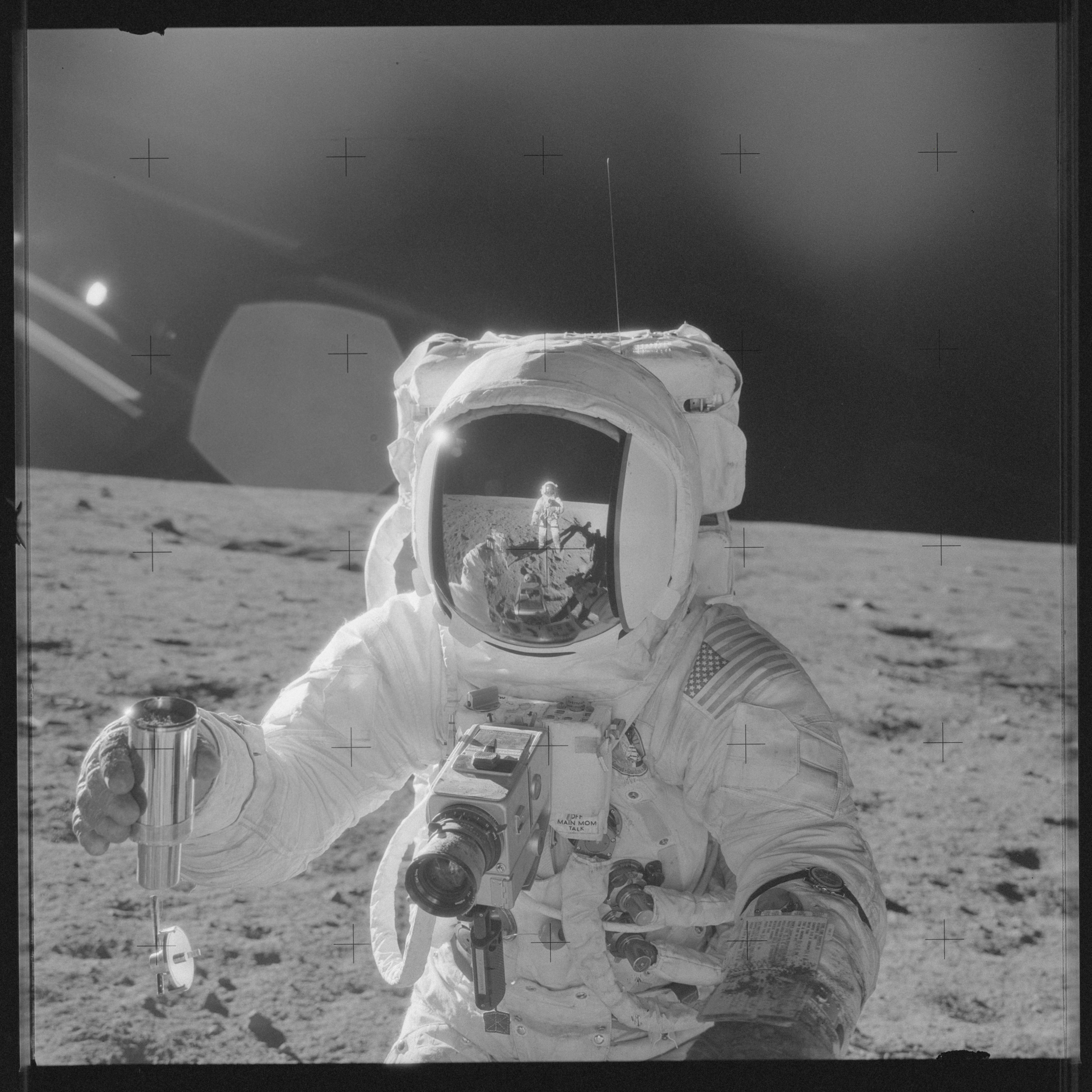
Lunar Module Pilot Alan Bean holding sample 12023, in the LESC.
