= Cone (crater) =

Crater on the Moon

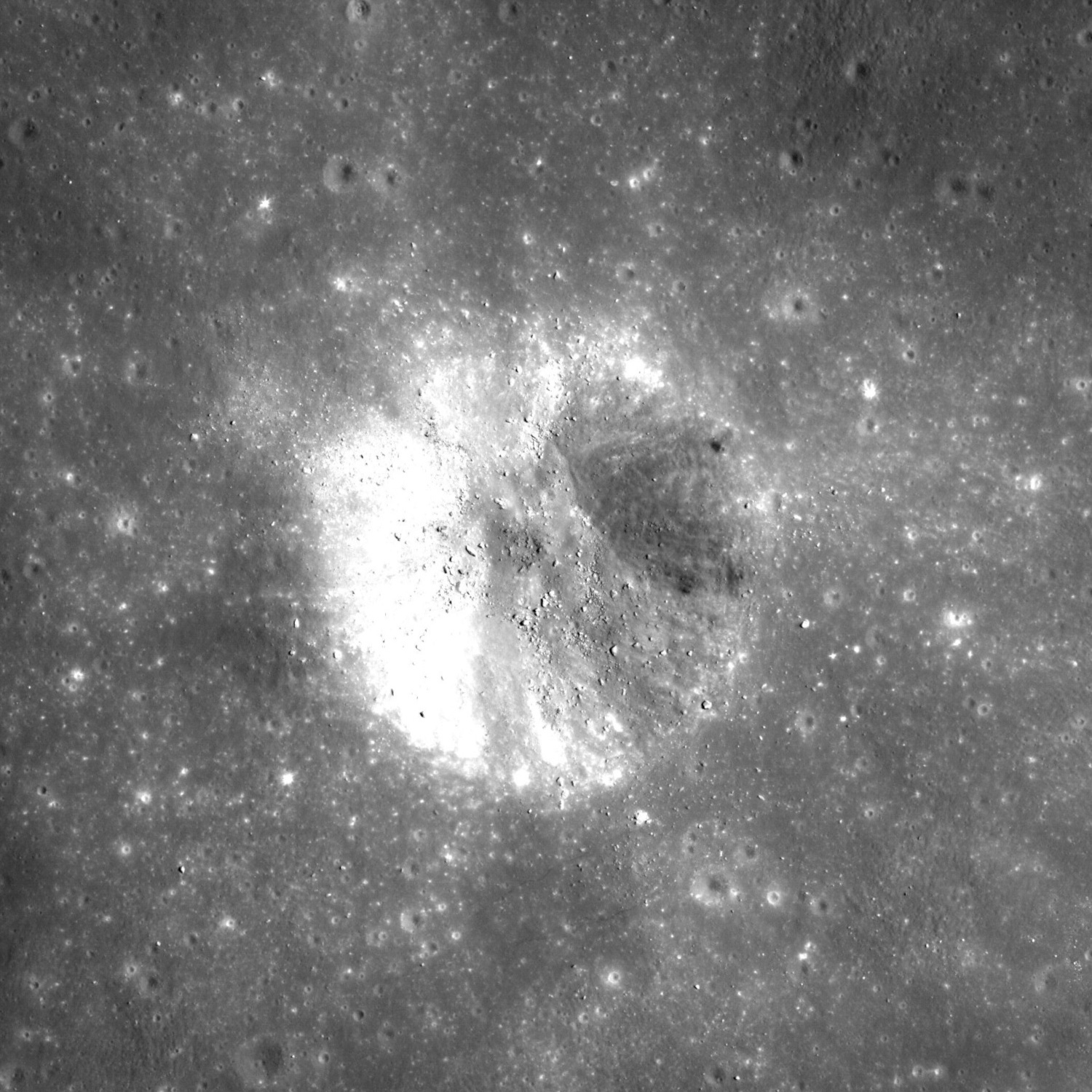
- LRO Narrow Angle Camera image. The astronaut tracks are visible as dark lines south of the crater rim.
- Coordinates: 3.62°S 17.43°W
- Diameter: 330 m
- Eponym: Astronaut-named feature

Cone crater is a small crater in the Fra Mauro highlands, north of Fra Mauro crater, on the Moon. The name of the crater was formally adopted by the IAU in 1973.

The Apollo 14 astronauts Alan Shepard and Edgar Mitchell landed the Lunar Module (LM) Antares southwest of Cone crater on February 5, 1971. During the descent, Cone crater was a major landmark. Sampling ejecta from Cone was a primary scientific goal of the mission, as Cone would have penetrated the lunar regolith (soil) and brought some of the Fra Mauro Formation to the surface. The Fra Mauro Formation is interpreted as ejecta from the Imbrium impact event - an important time-stratigraphic marker in lunar history. The astronauts attempted to reach Cone on their second EVA, and came very close to it and sampled the ejecta. But due to confusing topography they never reached the rim of the crater.

The geologic station C1 is at the cluster of boulders called White Rocks (including Saddle Rock), close to the south rim of the crater. Station C' is to the southeast of C1 along the rim of a small, unnamed crater. Stations C2, B2, B3 and Dg are to the southwest of Cone but within its continuous ejecta blanket. Also to the southwest is a small crater informally named Flank.

Lunar geologist Don Wilhelms stated that the ejecta of Cone "in my opinion is the most important single point reached by astronauts on the Moon." He was disappointed in the low amount of time spent by the astronauts collecting samples and documenting the boulders, particularly at station C1, the most likely representation of the Fra Mauro Formation.

== Gallery ==
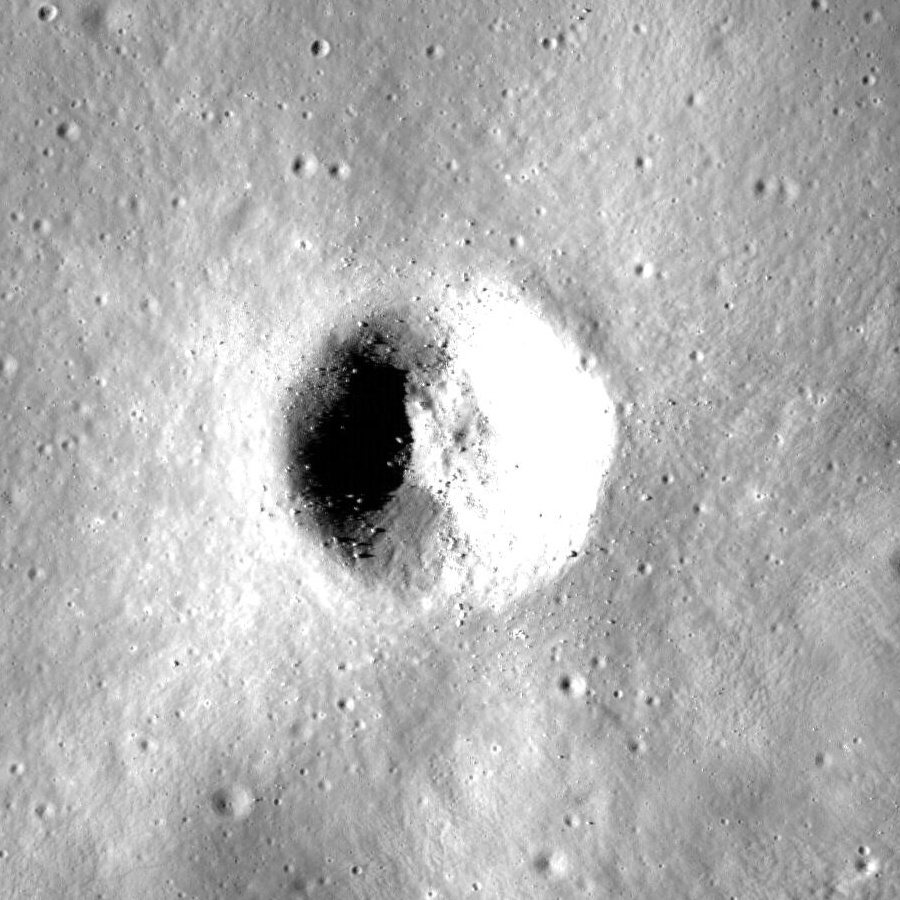
Another LRO image with a much lower sunlight angle

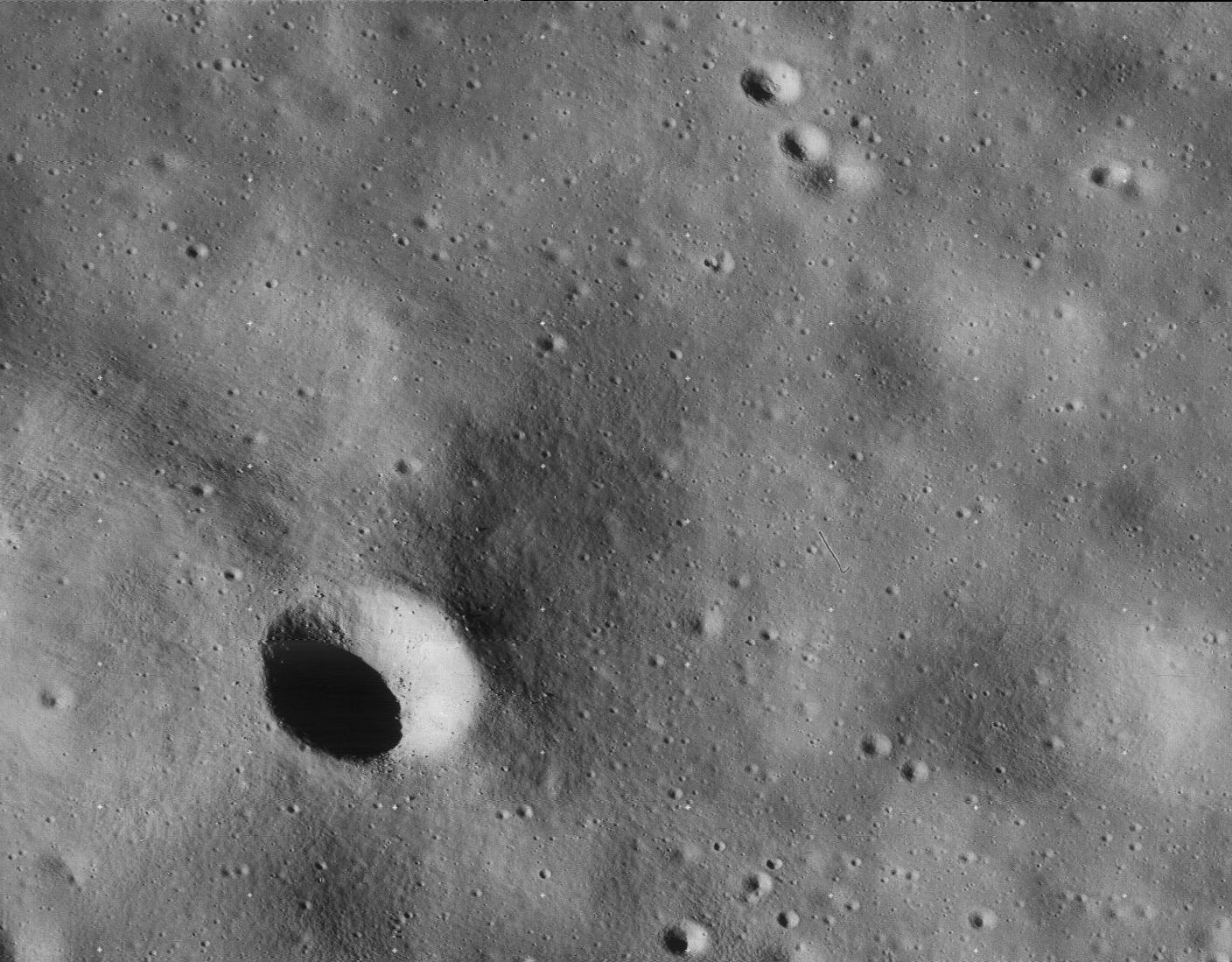
This was the best pre-Apollo 14 image of Cone crater and the landing site, taken by Lunar Orbiter 3

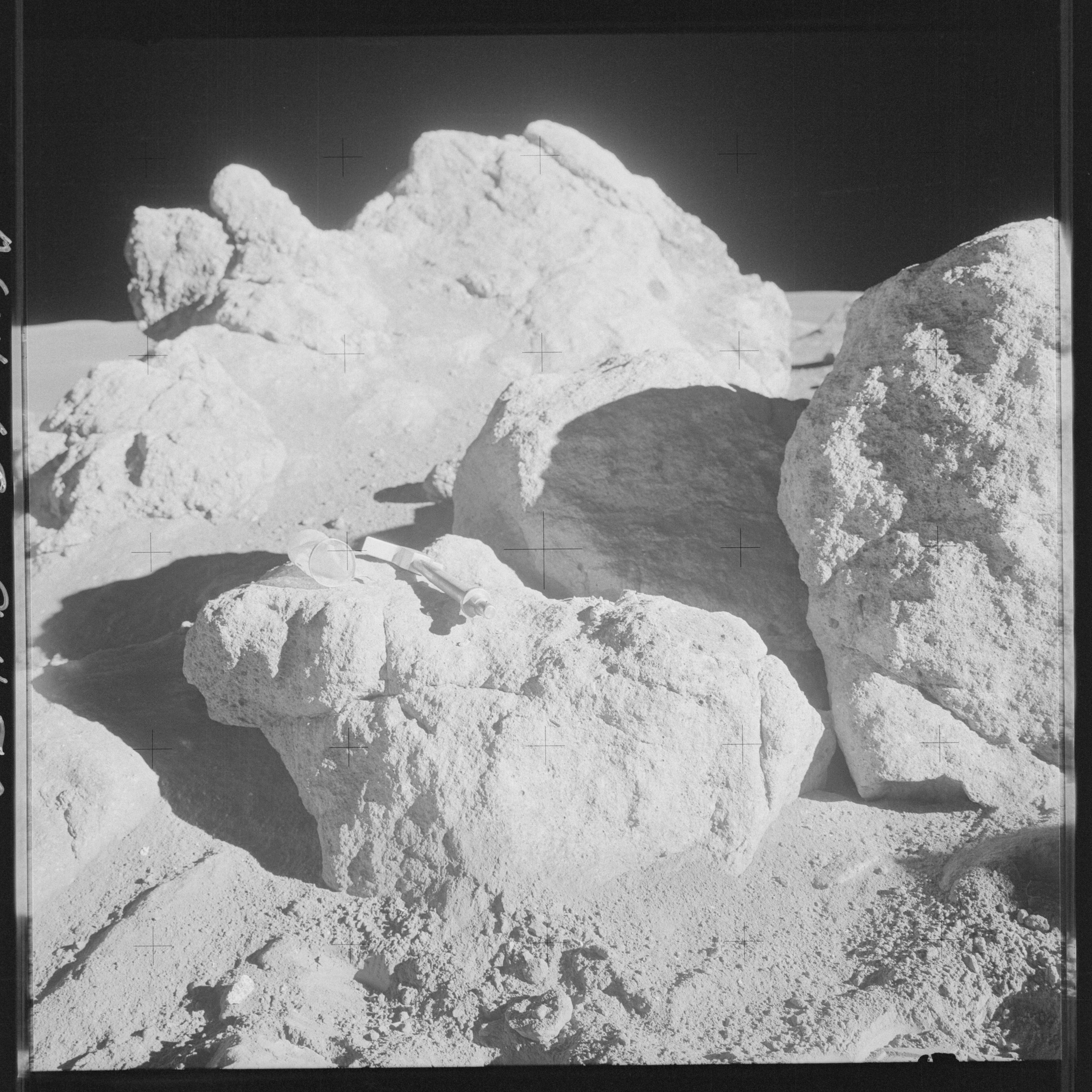
Boulders of ejecta from Cone crater known as Saddle Rock (Station C1 of the mission), sampled by the astronauts

== Samples ==
The following samples were collected from Stations C1 and C', as shown in Figure 3-33 and Table 3-III of the Apollo 14 Preliminary Science Report,. Sample type, lithology, and descriptions are from the Lunar Sample Atlas of the Lunar and Planetary Institute. Lithology is from the Lunar Sample Compendium.

=== Station C1 ===
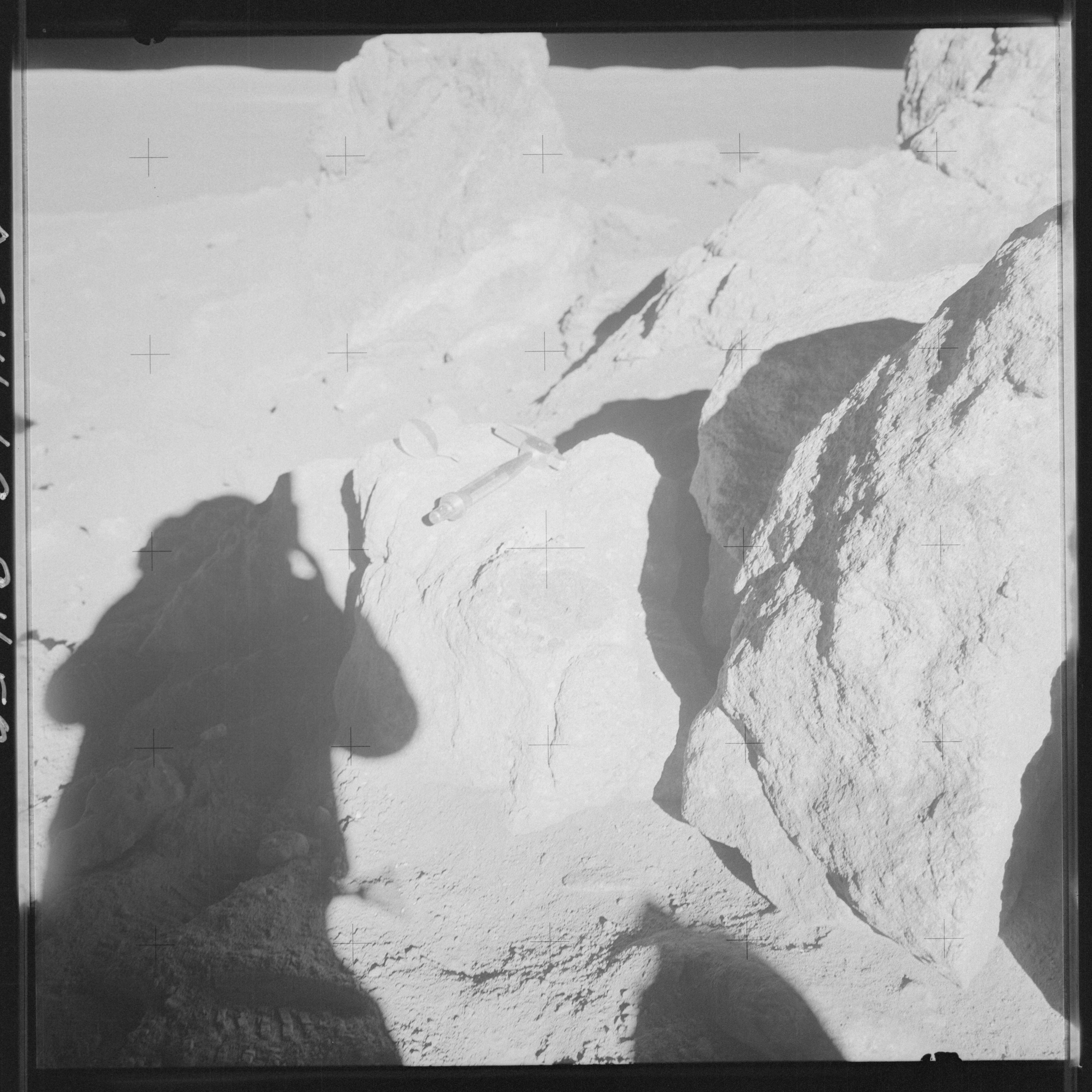
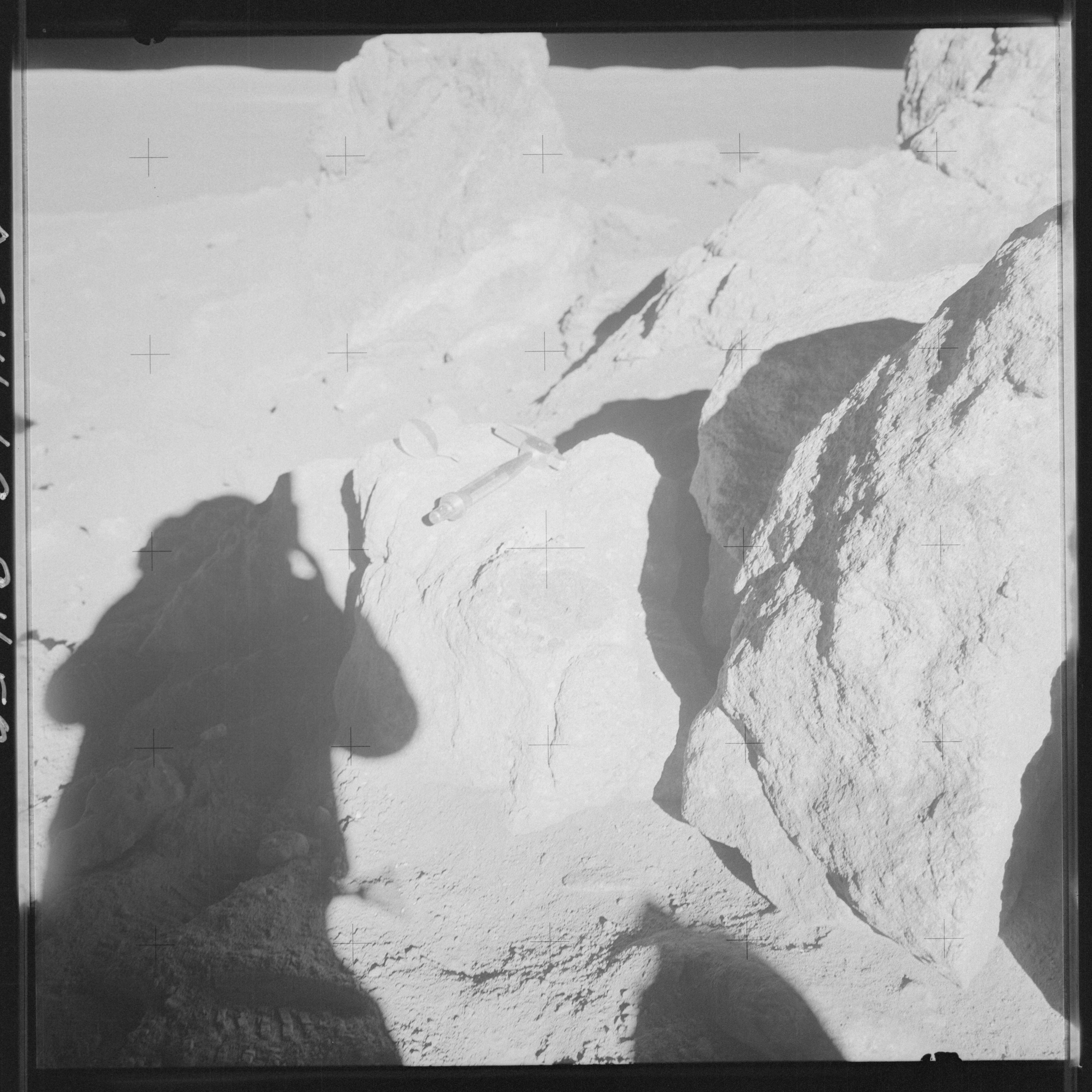
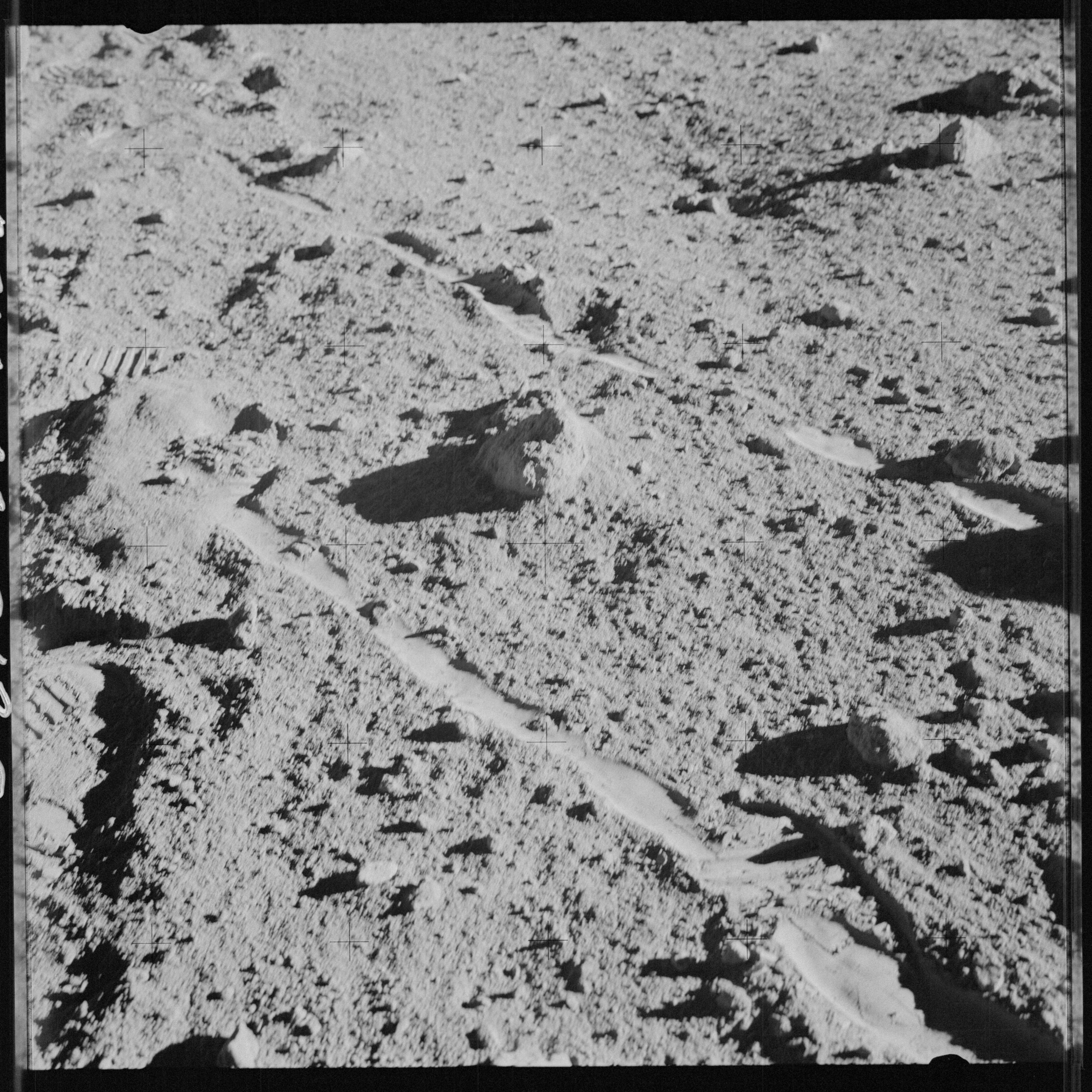
Sample	Sample Type	In Situ Photo	Lithology	Description
14063	rock	-	Light matrix Breccia	So-Called "White Rocks"; friable with dark clasts (Wilshire and Jackson 1972); annealed or slightly annealed, feldspathic Fra Mauro breccia (Chao et al 1972); "white rock breccia" (Quaide and Wrigley 1972);
14064	rock	-	Light matrix Breccia	Sample 14064 was collected in the White Rocks area at Station C1 and was returned in bag 16 along with 14063 and 14065 (residue) in ALSRC 1006. There was a strong feeling at the LRL that 14064 and 14063 are parts of the same rock because not only do they look very much alike, but 14064 has a protruding 1 cm clast, while 14063 has a 1 cm clast mold. Shepard stated that he had put "a couple" of hand specimens into bag 16, which is what was found. Sample 14064 is one of those studied by the Imbrium Consortium. Sample is pale gray with leucocratic matrix and contains approximately 40% clasts and 60% matrix. The sample is friable "white rock".
14065	residue	-	-	-
14082 and 14083	rock		Light matrix Breccia	Samples 14082/14083 are white rocks collected at Station C1, 1.24 km ENE of the LM and 17 m SE of the rim of Cone Crater. They are representative of one of the major rock types as seen in lunar photo documentation. The sample was chipped from the top of White Rock, a 1 m breccia boulder with consipicous 1 cm dark and light clasts in a very light gray matrix. This sample was placed in bag 13N and returned in ALSRC 1006. By the time it had arrived at the LRL, it had broken into two pieces and these were numbered 14082 and 14083. Sample 14082 was studied extensively by the Ibrium Consortium, from which much of this information is derived. Sample 14082/14083 is one of the white rocks. It is a polymict breccia with a very light gray matrix and darker lithic clasts.
14084	-		-	-
14321	rock		Clast-rich, Crystalline Matrix Breccia	Largest sample returned during Apollo 14 mission; also known as "Big Bertha". This sample is the third largest sample returned by any Apollo mission. This breccia was collected during the second EVA at Station C1, near the rim of Cone Crater. A voice transcript made during the collection, as well as a more detailed discussion of the lunar environment can be found in Geological Survey Professional Paper 880 (Swann et al., 1977). The sample was returned in bag 1038. This large sample is typical of the apparently dominant rock type in the Cone Crater ejecta blanket. It is a moderately well-indurated breccia, in which predominately dark clasts are set in a lighter matrix. The relative abundance of this rock type suggests that it is probably representative of the Fra Mauro Formation. This rock, 14321, is a partly annealed, moderately coherent polymict breccia. The blocky surface is gray with patches of black and white.

=== Station C' ===
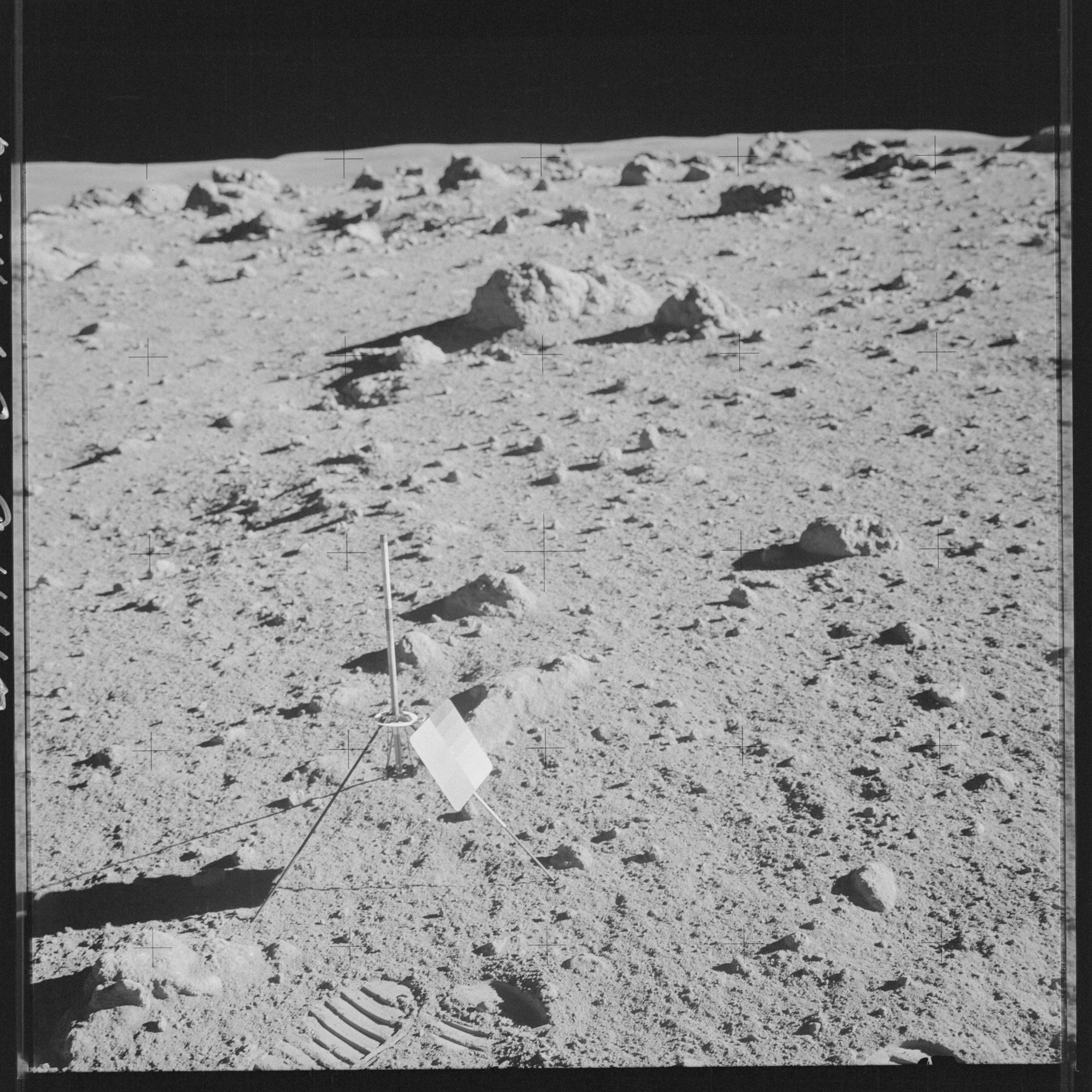
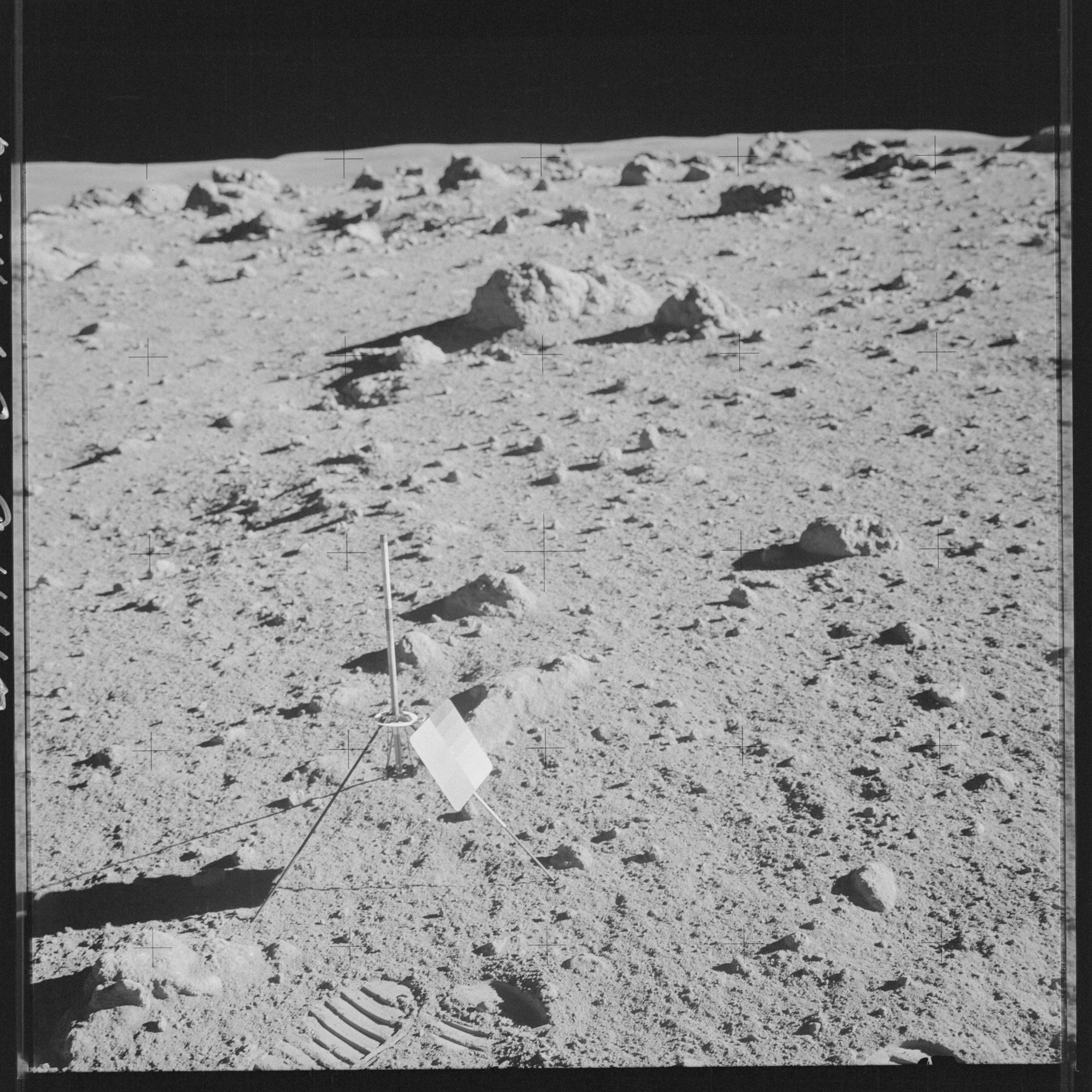
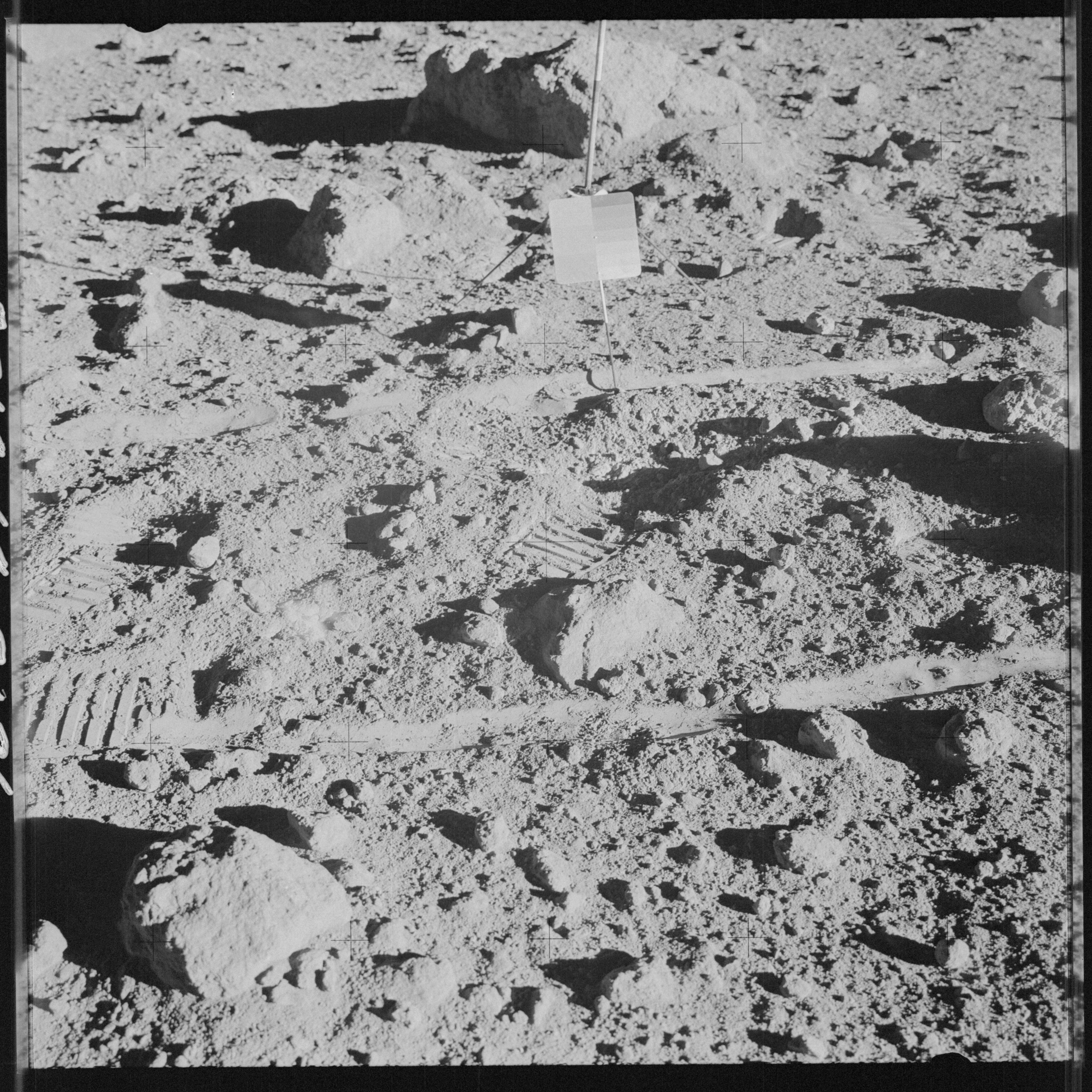
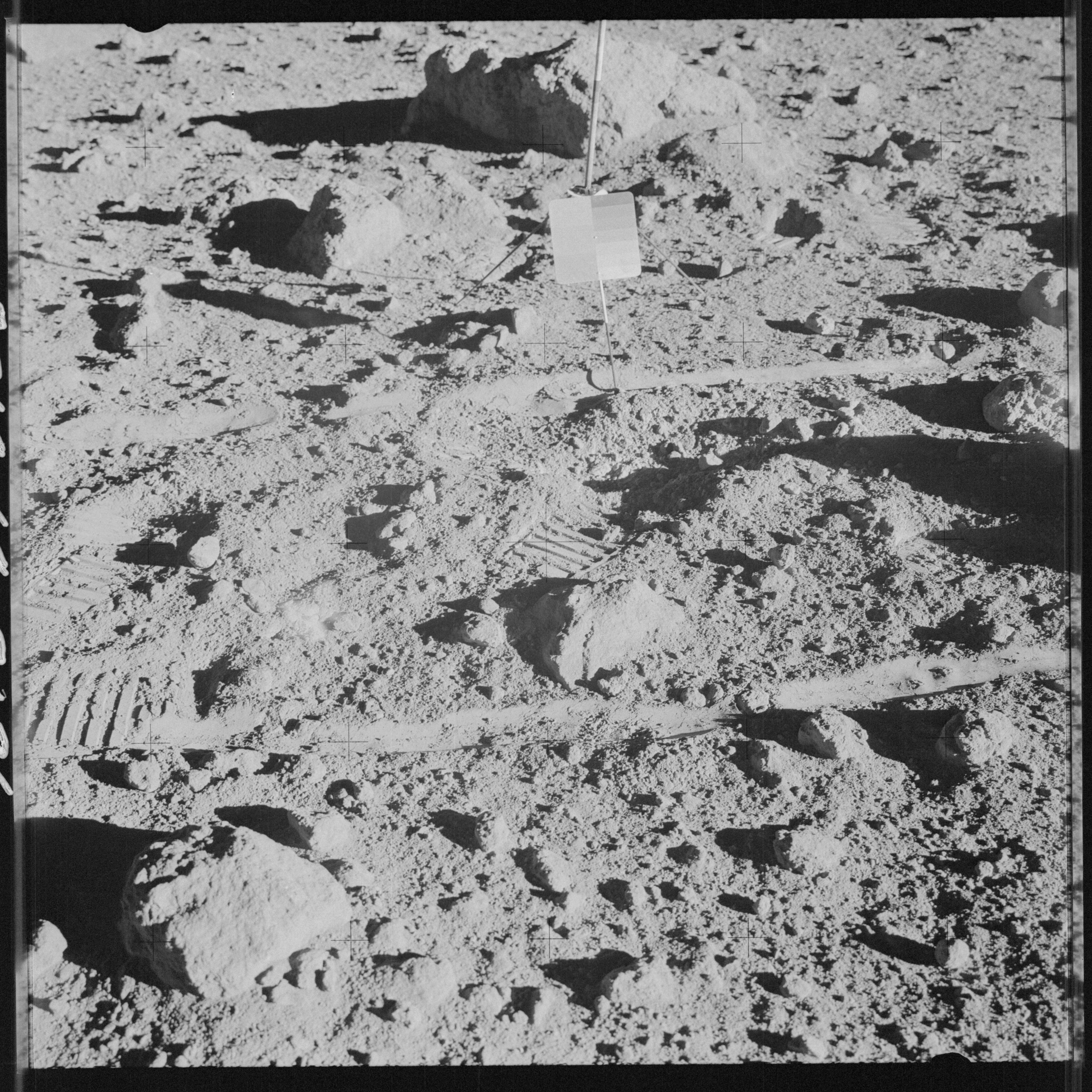
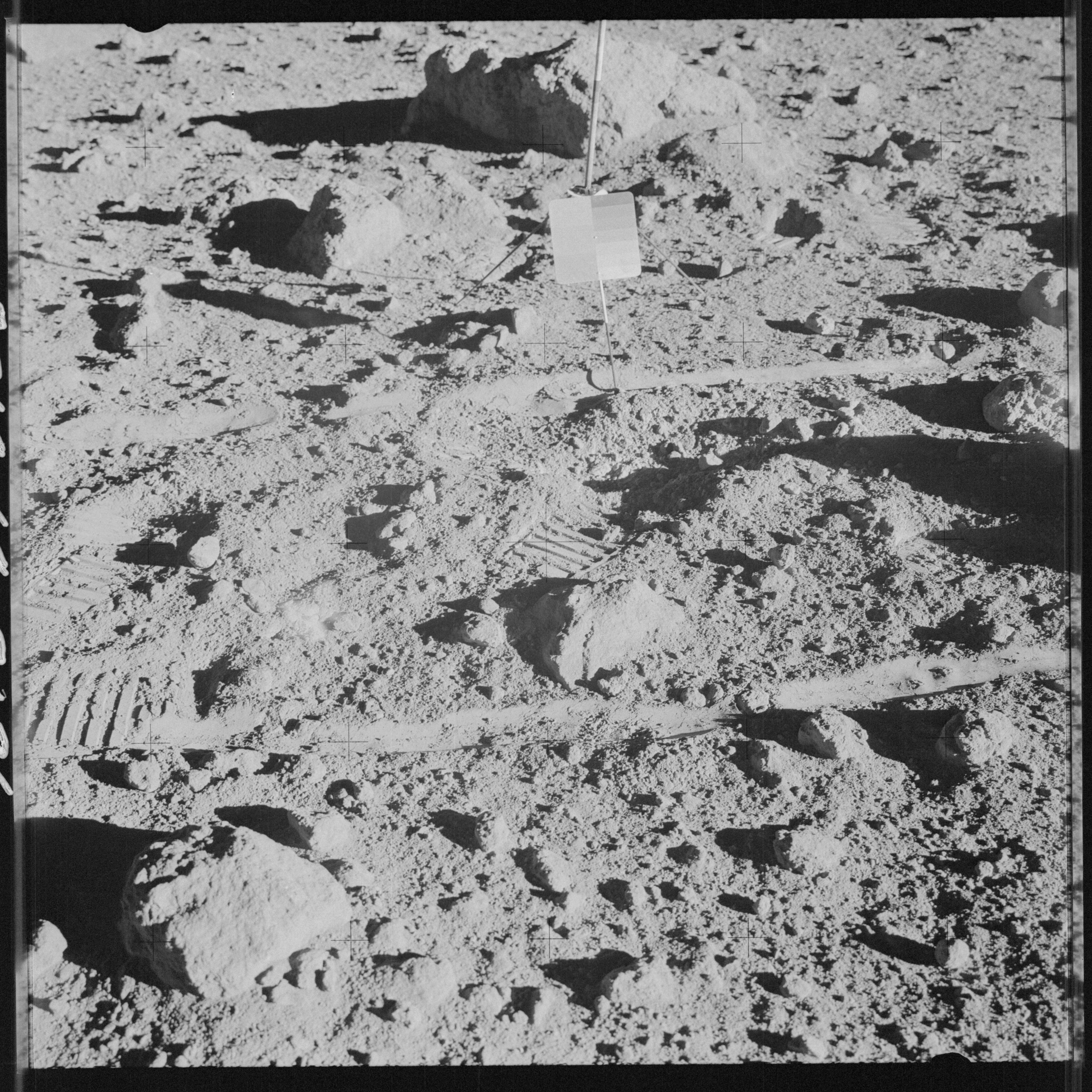
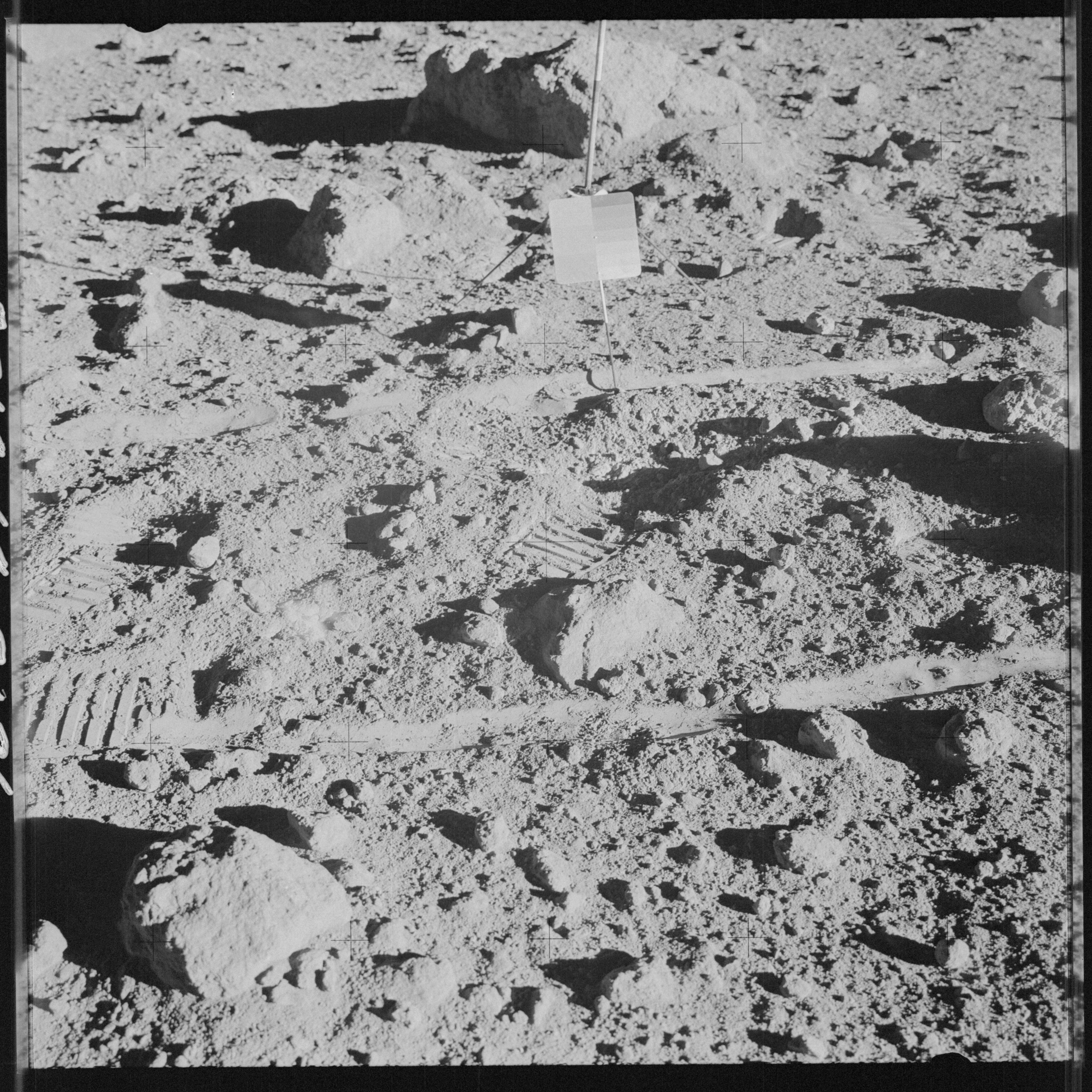
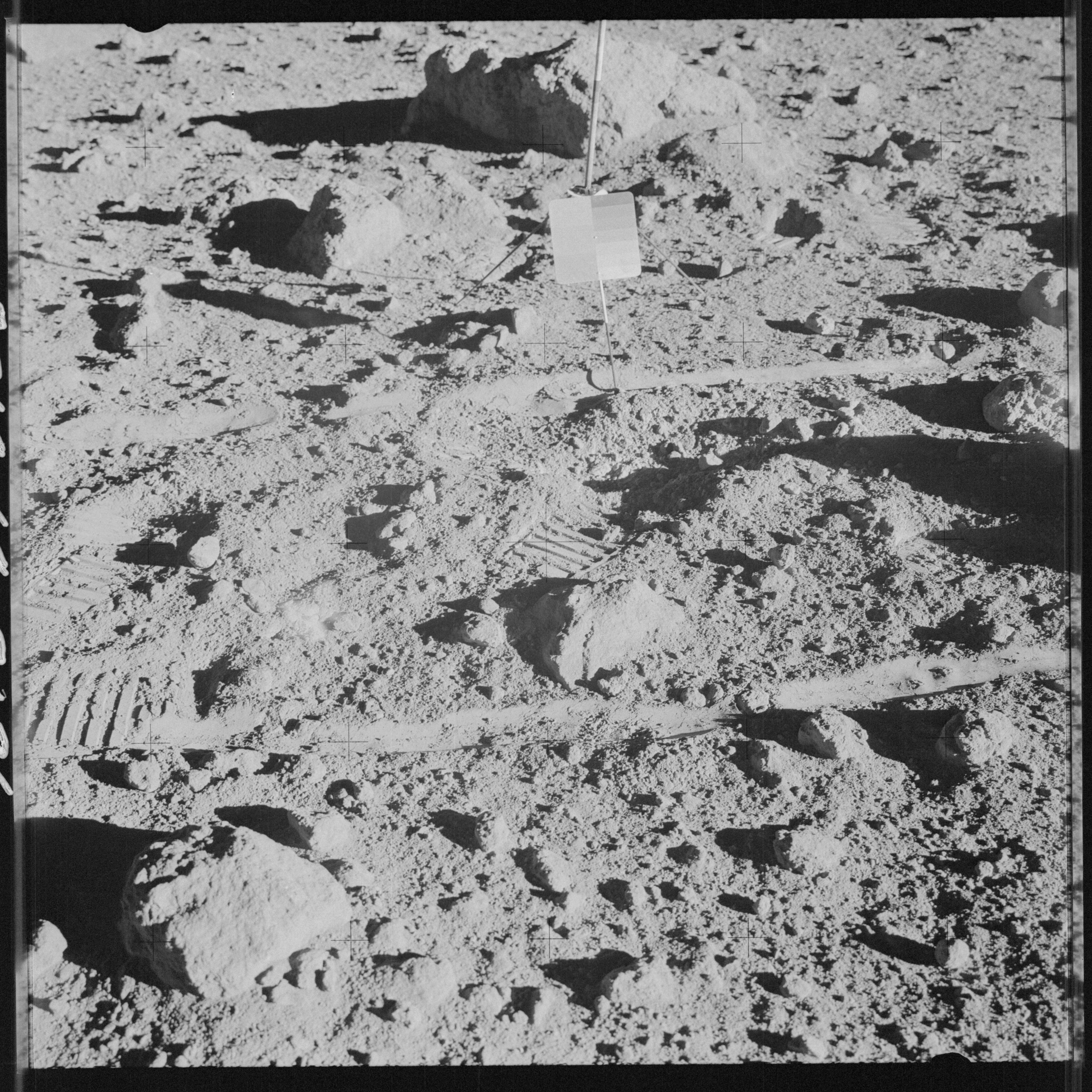
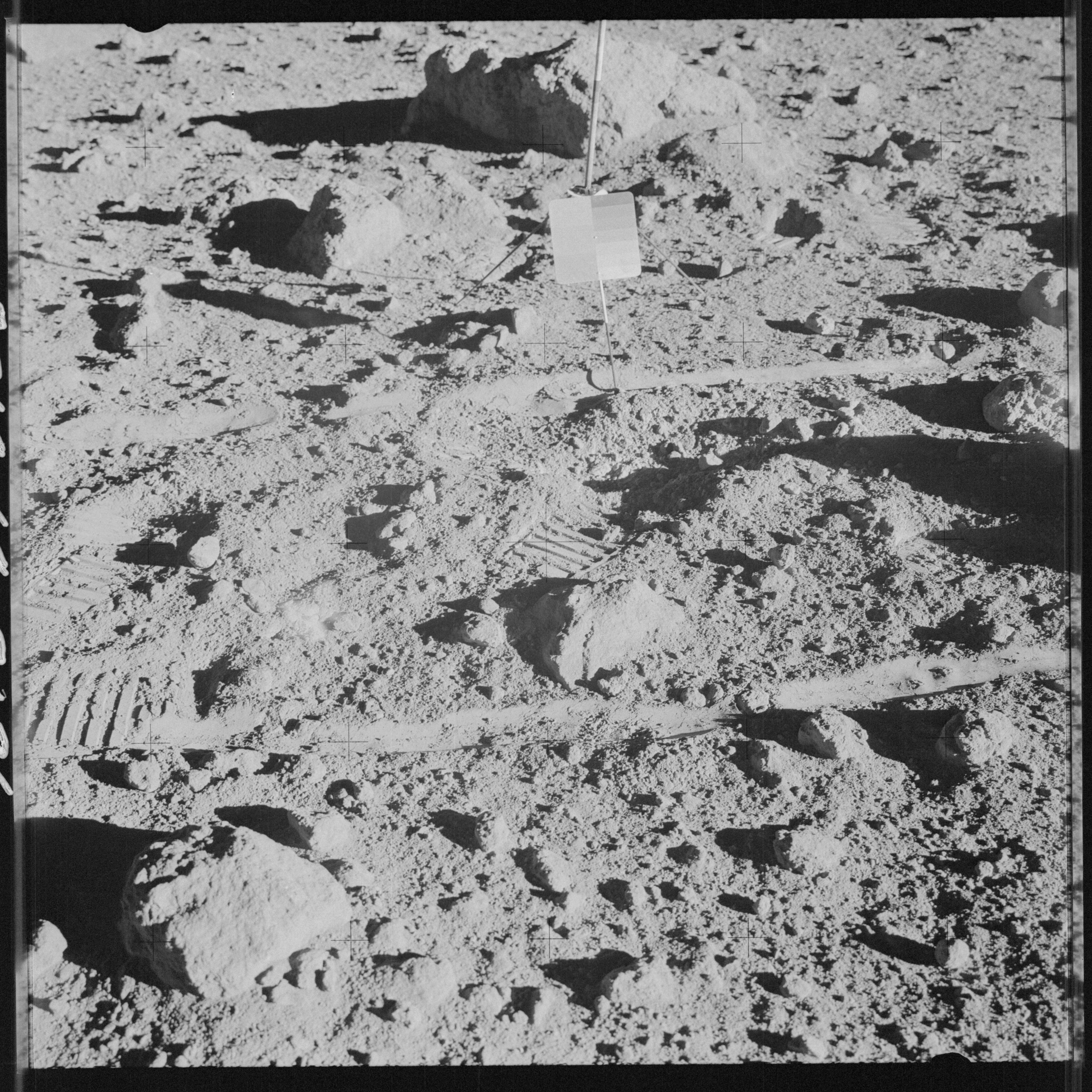
Sample	Sample Type	In Situ Photo	Lithology	Description
14051	rock		Impact Melt Breccia	Sample 14051 was collected at station C' which was located 1.29 km ENE of LM and approximately 95 m SE of the rim of Cone Crater. The sample was collected on a gentle southward slope and was partly buried. The area was characterized by abundant fragments ranging from the limit of resolution up to 1.5 m blocks. The sample was returned in documented bag 7N in ALSRC 1006.
14052	-		-	-
14068	rock		Crystalline-matrix Breccia	Sample 14068 was collected during the second EVA from station C1 and placed in bag number 10. It is one of the surface rocks collected while a gray layer, just under the surface, was samples 14140-14143; blocky, gray, coherent, holocrystalline, melt rock with less than 5% clasts.
14069	rock		Crystalline-matrix Breccia	Sample 14069 was collected at Station C1, 1.28 km ENE of the LM and 100 m SE of the rim of Cone Crater during the second EVA. The material at C1 appears to be material originally ejected from Cone Crater and re-ejected from a 30 m crater just south of Station C1 (Swann et al., 1977). Sample is block, gray, finely crystalline breccia with a sugary texture.
14070	rock		Crystalline-matrix Breccia	Sample 14070 was collected from Station C1, 1.28 km ENE of the LM, and 100 m SE of the rim of Cone Crater during the second EVA. It appears to have been ejected from Cone Crater that was later re-ejected from a 30 m crater in the vicinity (Swann et al., 1977). This is a blocky, subangular, coherent, light gray, crystalline breccia that is similar to 14069.
14071	rock		Olivine Basalt	Sample 14071 was collected at Station C1 approximately 1.28 km ENE of LM and 100 m SE of Cone Crater. The area is locally flat with a slight southerly slope. The sample was collected amongst abundant debris ranging in size from the limit of resoution up to 75 cm. The photo-documented area was too disturbed to be able to see any intact craters. The sample was returned in documented bay 10N in ALSRC 1006. All the samples collected in the vicinity of 14071 are blocky and angular to subrounded with very rough surfaces.
14072	-		Olivine Basalt	Sample 14072 was collected at Station C1 approximately 1.28 km ENE of LM and 100 m SE of Cone Crater. The area is locally flat but generally slopes slightly to the south. The area is strewn with debris which ranges in size from the limit of resoution up to 75 cm. The debris is mainly angular to subrounded. The entire area of photo documentation is too disturbed to see any intact craters. The sample was returned in documented bag 10N in ALSRC 1006. Sample is medium light gray basalt and is somewhat smooth in appearance. The shape is blocky to subrounded and the rock is extremely coherent.
14140 to 14144	-		soil	Samples 14140, 14141, 14142, 14143, 14144 and 14068, 14069, 14070, 14071, and 14072 were collected 3 meters from the rim of a 15 meter crater just south of Cone crater. 14141 is a surface soil identified by crew as a light gray layer, 14068 through 14072 is a sample of some surface rocks in the area. The area near the rim of Cone crater is strewn with boulders up to 3 meters.
