= Lunar Seismic Profiling Experiment =

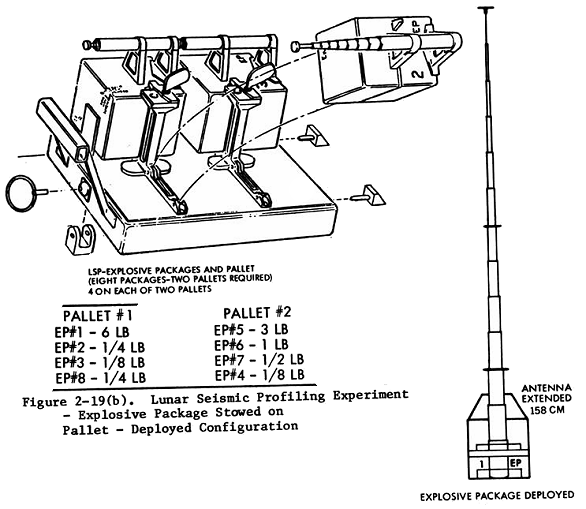
- Diagram of a charge from the Lunar Seismic Profiling Experiment
- Acronym: LSPE
- Notable experiments: Apollo 17

The Lunar Seismic Profiling Experiment (LSPE) was a lunar science experiment, deployed by astronauts on the lunar surface in 1972 as part of Apollo 17. The goal of the LSPE was to record the seismic response generated by a variety of sources including the detonation of eight explosive charges, the ascent propulsion system on the lunar module and any natural sources.

== Background ==
The Active Seismic Experiment (ASE) had flown on both Apollo 14 and 16 providing information both about near-surface structures through the use of mortars, and information about deep lunar structures by measuring the impacts of previous lunar modules and Saturn V third stages. However, between these two sub-surface levels, little was known about the upper 10 km of the Moon's surface. The LSPE was specifically designed to reduce this knowledge gap. It would record the seismic response generated by a variety of sources including the detonation of eight explosive charges and the ascent propulsion system on the Apollo Lunar Module, to provide information on the upper levels of the lunar crust at depths of several kilometers.

== Instrument ==
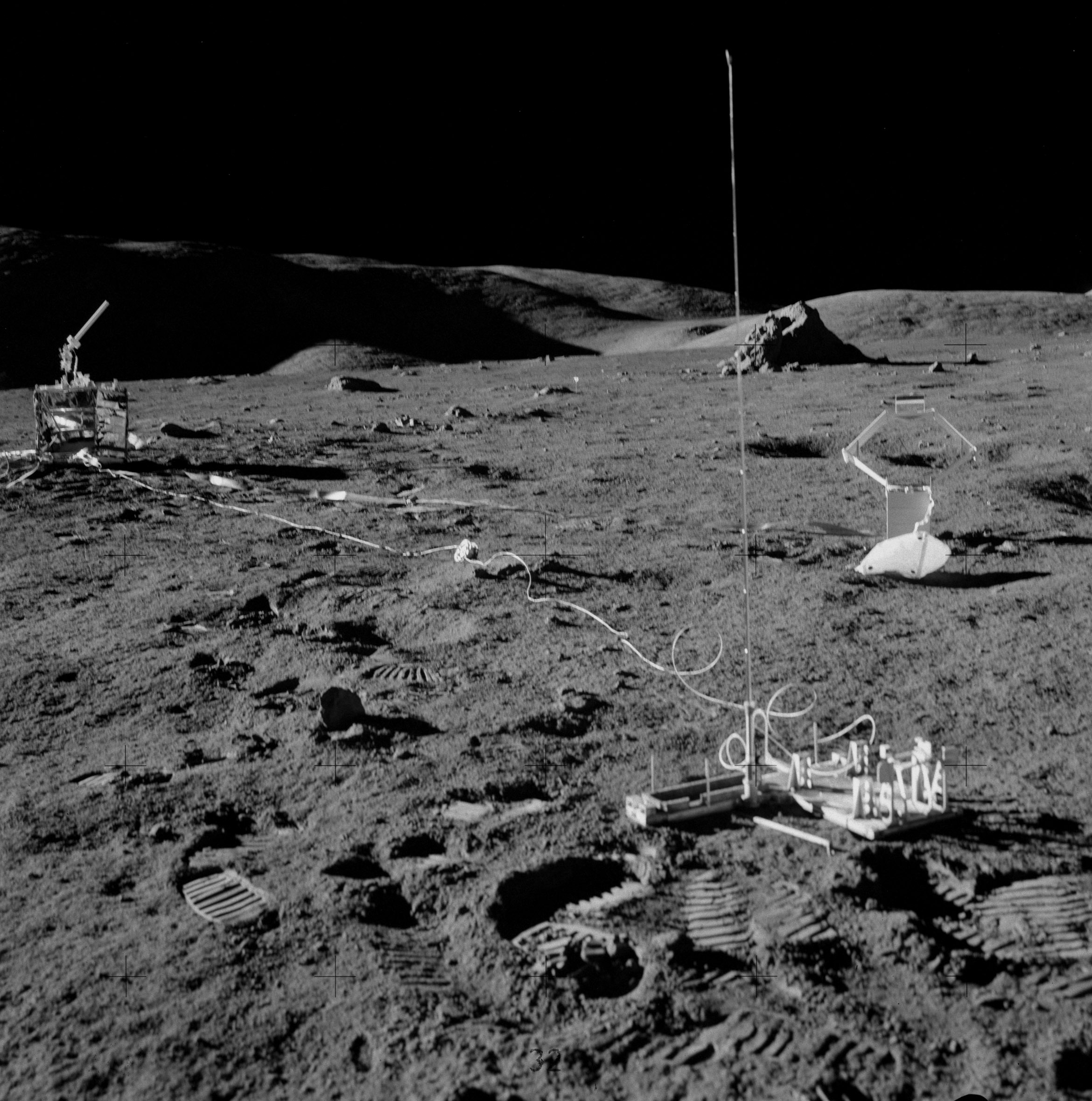
The antenna for Lunar Seismic Profiling Experiment.

The LSPE differed from the Active Seismic Experiment by having larger explosive packages that could be deployed further away allowing for the greater exploration at depth. The Active Seismic Experiment's explosive charges were based on a rocket-propelled mortar, whereas the explosives used with the LSPE were placed directly onto the Moon's surface at distance from the geophones. This necessitated an active transmitter as part of the LSPE package in order to trigger the explosive packages whereas the ASE only had a receiver that would trigger the firing of the charges rocket and would detonate upon impact with the lunar surface. The geophone array for the LSPE had a triangular configuration plus a central geophone whereas the ASE had a linear geophone array.

The experiment's components primarily consisted of an array of four geophones and eight explosive charges of mixed yield. The four geophones were in effect miniaturised moving coil-magnet seismometers. Each explosive charge consisted of molded Hexanitrostilbene and Teflon in a 90:10 ratio and were similar in composition to those that flew as part of Apollo 14. The set of eight explosive charges consisted of two pairs of 1/8-pound (57 g) and 1/4-pound (113 g) charges and another four charges each weighing 1/2 lb (227 g), 1 lb (454 g), 3 lb (1,361 g), and 6 lb (2,722 g). All charges were cylindrical except the 6-pound charge which was cubic in shape. Triggering of explosives would be done remotely after the safe departure of the Apollo 17 astronauts from the surface of the Moon.

The explosives had a number of fail-safe mechanisms to prevent premature detonation. The explosive safe/arm plate was held in place by a pull pin and a timed release mechanism, itself only initiated with the removal of an independent pull ring. A secondary firing timer along with a firing pin mechanism both had pull pins that had to be removed as part of deployment. If either timers started prematurely, they would lock the pull rings into place so that they could not be removed. If the safe arm timed mechanism released early the safe/arm pull ring would be locked into place and could not be removed. The safe/arm timed mechanism would not retract until at least 90 hours after deployment and each explosive package had its own distinct arming time. Each explosive package had its own thermal battery that would power a receiver. Each explosive package would only detonate upon successfully receiving an ignition signal from the experiment package.

== Operation and deployment ==
During the first EVA, the LSP experiment's 4 geophones were deployed as part of the ALSEP package. Geophones 1 and 2 would be placed to run in sequence aligned with the Sun either side of the ALSEP package. The other two geophones were then placed in a sequence running perpendicular to geophones 1 and 2, creating a triangle with three geophones with one geophone located in the middle. The experiment's antenna was erected and the explosive transport modules were placed into sunlight. This was because the thermal timers and arming mechanisms were not permitted below a temperature of 40 °F (4 °C). The mission's second and third EVA were used to place the explosive packages at a variety of locations, with varying distances and directions from the Apollo 17 landing site. These packages were deployed up to a maximum distance of 2.7 km (1.7 mi). Once deployment was completed, the experiment package would transmit firing signals to the explosive packages. Triggering of explosives would be done remotely after the safe departure of the Apollo 17 astronauts from the surface of the Moon. As part of the deployment process, the astronaut would remove three pull rings from each explosive package, which would in total remove four safety pins.

== Science ==
The eight explosive charges provided detectable seismic two-way traveltime signal down to depths of 2.7 km. The impact of the Apollo 17 lunar module ascent stage provided a detectable two-way signal from a depth of 5 km of the Moon's surface. The instrument identified that beneath the Apollo 17 landing site there were three layers in the upper 5 km, with distinctive seismic velocity properties. The first was a surface layer 248 m thick with a seismic velocity of 250 ms^{−1}. This surface layer lay atop a ~927 m thick layer with a faster seismic velocity of 1200 ms^{−1}. Explosive package #1, the furthest from the geophone array, generated slower travel times than was expected. This was explained by the presence of the Camelot crater either through interaction with the crater structure itself or that the crater resulted in slower material being present at depth. The impact of the Apollo 17 lunar module suggested that at depth there was material with a seismic velocity of 4000 ms^{−1}. Data from this impact required normalisation due the impact site being elevated 1.4 km above the Apollo 17 landing site.

Interpretation of the seismic velocities with other geological relationships led to two primary structural inferences. The first was that the top two layers of seismically distinct materials were likely composed of basaltic lava flows. The seismically fastest and likely deepest layer, has been interpreted to consist primarily of breccias that primarily composes the highland material that surrounded the Apollo 17 valley landing site. A breccia sample taken by Apollo 15 was found through laboratory measurements to have a similar seismic velocity to the 4000 ms^{−1}. The experiment package provided passive observation of lunar seismic events between August 15, 1976, and April 25, 1977.
