= Active Seismic Experiment =

Geophysical experiment carried out at the Moon surface by Apollo missions

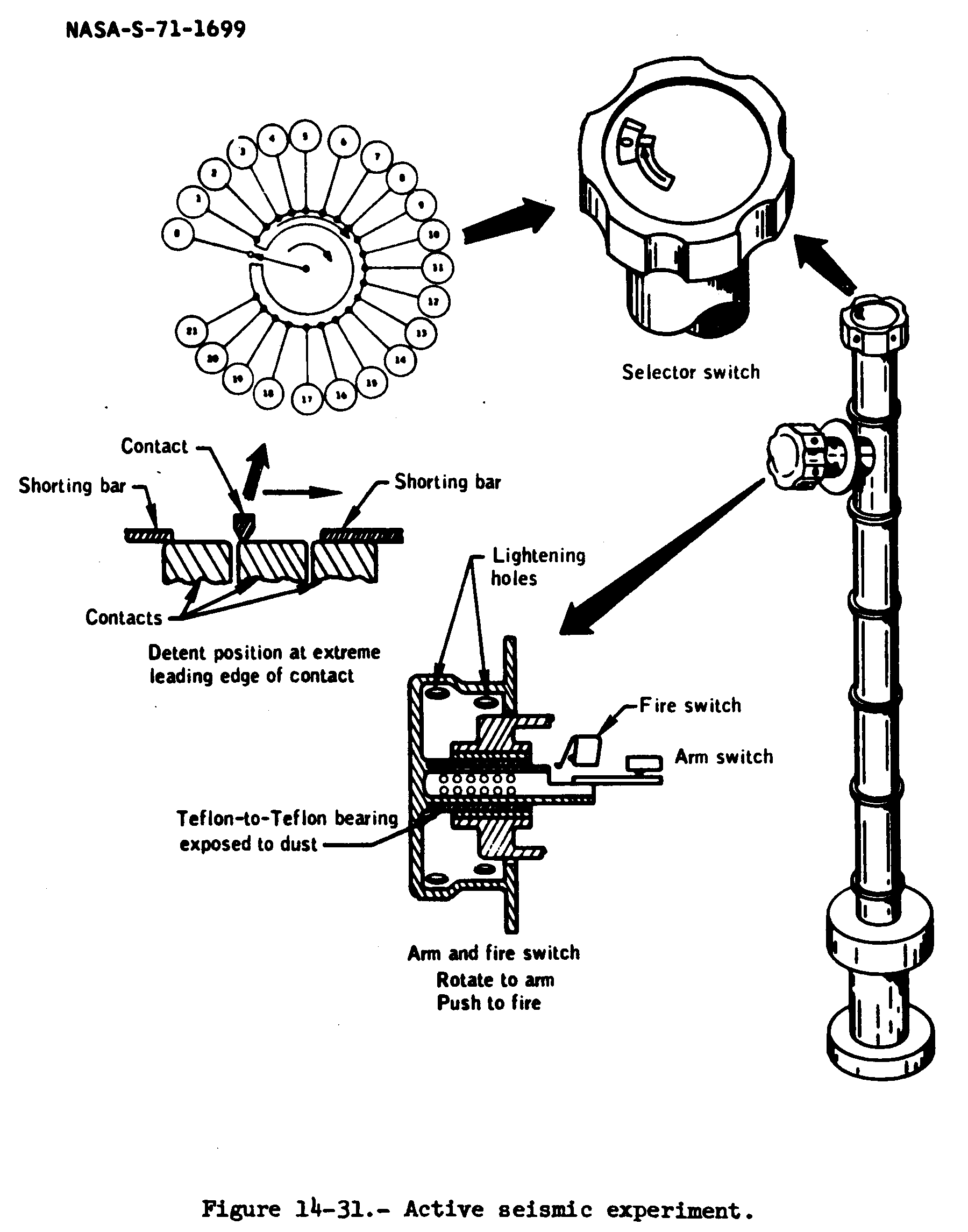
Diagram of the ASE

Active Seismic Experiment (ASE) was carried on Apollo 14 and Apollo 16 as part of the Apollo Lunar Surface Experiments Package (ALSEP). ASE used a thumper device and a mortar with explosive charges to explore subsurface lunar structure and elastic properties. The experiment's principal investigator was Robert Kovach of Stanford University. The experiment was succeeded on Apollo 17 by the Lunar Seismic Profiling Experiment.

== Experiment ==
The ASE consisted of three major components. A set of three geophones was laid out in a line by an astronaut from the Central Station to detect the explosions. A mortar package was designed to lob a set of four grenades varying distances away from the ALSEP. Ranging of the grenade was achieved through the assumption of ideal ballistic trajectories. Finally, an astronaut-activated "Thumper" was used to detonate one of 22 charges to create a small shock. The components weighed 11.2 kilograms (25 lb), drew 9.75 watts of power and recorded data at an average rate of 10,000 bits/sec.

Hexanitrostilbene was the main explosive fill in the seismic source generating mortar ammunition canisters used as part of the Apollo Lunar Active Experiments Package. Grenades containing 45–450 grams (1.6–15.9 oz) of hexanitrostilbene were used with the mortar. This explosive was chosen due to its insensitivity but high explosive properties.

== Missions ==
=== Apollo 14 ===
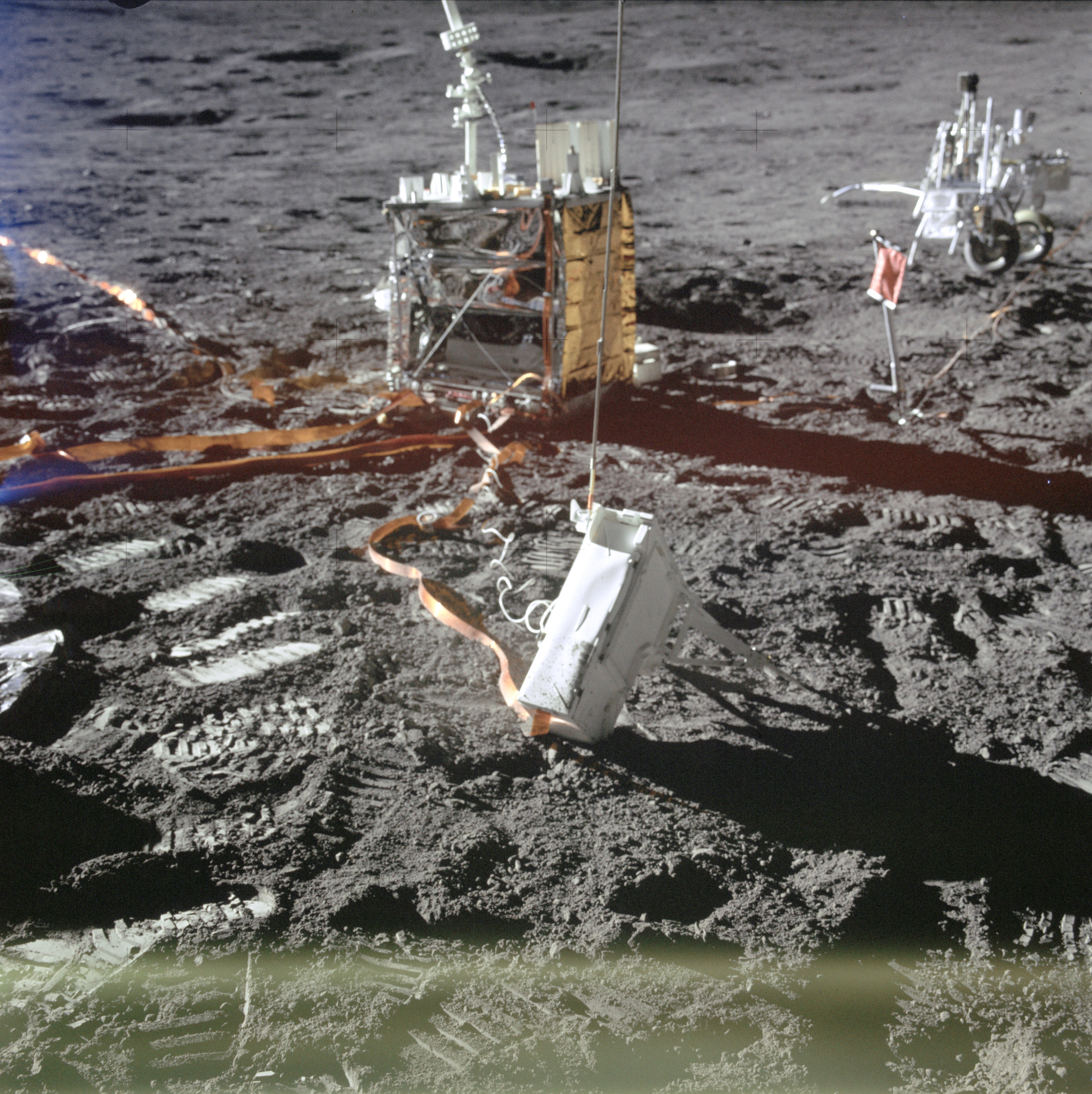
Apollo 14 Active Seismic Experiment.

The mortar, geophones, and thumper were stored on the first subpackage. Thirteen of the twenty-two thumper charges were fired successfully. The thumper misfired 5 of 18 times. The problem was attributed to dirt on the firing switch actuator bearing surface. Because of concerns about the deployment of the mortar, none of the four explosives were fired. There was an attempt to fire them at the end of the ALSEP's operational lifetime, but the charges failed to work after being dormant for so long. Due to loss of uplink capability with Apollo 14 central station on March 5, 1975, the experiment could no longer be commanded and the grenades remain unfired.

=== Apollo 16 ===
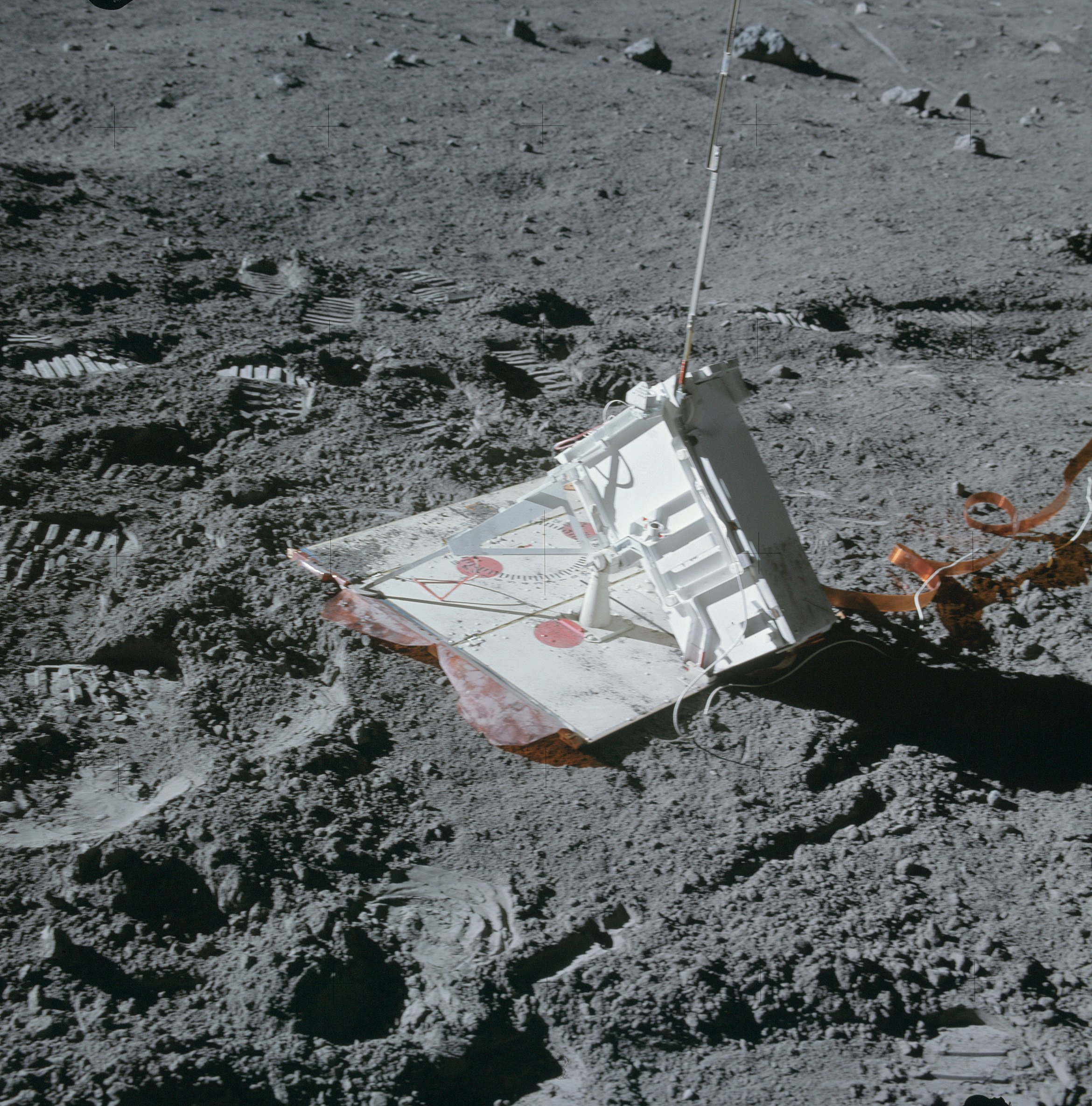
Apollo 16 Active Seismic Experiment.

The new mortar base used to improve the experiment after problems were encountered with Apollo 14's. The mortar, geophones, and thumper were stored on the first subpackage. The base of the mortar box was stored on the second subpackage. Three grenades were fired, up to a distance of 900 m. After three of the explosives were fired successfully, the pitch sensor went off scale. A range wire for one grenade has been suggested as the cause of the failure, producing a downward force after grenade launch. Normal real-time event data were not received during flight. It was then decided not to fire the fourth explosive. Nineteen of the Thumper charges were successfully fired.

== Results ==
The Active Seismic Experiments along with the Lunar Seismic Profiling experiment enabled researchers to derive a compressional velocity profile of the lunar subsurface at the landing sites of Apollo 14, Apollo 16 and Apollo 17. Whilst the regolith of the lunar surface varies in depth, the characteristics revealed were similar at the three landing sites. Seismic velocities of 108 m/s and 114 m/s were inferred for the lunar subsurface at the Apollo 14 Fra Mauro site and the Apollo 16 Descartes site respectively. These velocities suggested brecciated and highly porous material, likely the result of fragmentation and comminution caused by meteorite impacts.

== See also ==
- Lunar seismology
- Reflection seismology
- Seismic refraction
- Seismic tomography
- Seismic wave

== Bibliography ==
- Brzostowski, M.A., and Brzostowski, A.C., Archiving the Apollo active seismic data, The Leading Edge, Society of Exploration Geophysicists, April, 2009.
