= Elastic properties of the elements (data page) =

Chemical data page

Elastic properties describe the reversible deformation (elastic response) of a material to an applied stress. They are a subset of the material properties that provide a quantitative description of the characteristics of a material, like its strength.

Material properties are most often characterized by a set of numerical parameters called moduli. The elastic properties can be well-characterized by the Young's modulus, Poisson's ratio, Bulk modulus, and Shear modulus or they may be described by the Lamé parameters.

== Young's modulus ==
Young's modulus E (GPa)
number	symbol	name	use	WEL	CRC
3	Li	lithium	4.9	4.9	
4	Be	beryllium	287	287	
11	Na	sodium	10	10	
12	Mg	magnesium	45	45	
13	Al	aluminium	70	70	
14	Si	silicon	130–188	130–188	
20	Ca	calcium	20	20	
21	Sc	scandium	74.4	74	74.4
22	Ti	titanium	116	116	
23	V	vanadium	128	128	
24	Cr	chromium	279	279	
25	Mn	manganese	198	198	
26	Fe	iron	211	211	
27	Co	cobalt	209	209	
28	Ni	nickel	200	200	
29	Cu	copper	130	130	
30	Zn	zinc	108	108	
33	As	arsenic	8	8	
34	Se	selenium	10	10	
37	Rb	rubidium	2.4	2.4	
39	Y	yttrium	63.5	64	63.5
40	Zr	zirconium	68	68	
41	Nb	niobium	105	105	
42	Mo	molybdenum	329	329	
44	Ru	ruthenium	447	447	
45	Rh	rhodium	275	275 (possibly incorrect)	
46	Pd	palladium	121	121	
47	Ag	silver	83	83	
48	Cd	cadmium	50	50	
49	In	indium	11	11	
50	Sn	tin	50	50	
51	Sb	antimony	55	55	
52	Te	tellurium	43	43	
55	Cs	caesium	1.7	1.7	
56	Ba	barium	13	13	
57	La	lanthanum	(α form) 36.6	37	(α form) 36.6
58	Ce	cerium	(γ form) 33.6	34	(γ form) 33.6
59	Pr	praseodymium	(α form) 37.3	37	(α form) 37.3
60	Nd	neodymium	(α form) 41.4	41	(α form) 41.4
61	Pm	promethium	(α form) est. 46	46	(α form) est. 46
62	Sm	samarium	(α form) 49.7	50	(α form) 49.7
63	Eu	europium	18.2	18	18.2
64	Gd	gadolinium	(α form) 54.8	55	(α form) 54.8
65	Tb	terbium	(α form) 55.7	56	(α form) 55.7
66	Dy	dysprosium	(α form) 61.4	61	(α form) 61.4
67	Ho	holmium	64.8	65	64.8
68	Er	erbium	69.9	70	69.9
69	Tm	thulium	74.0	74	74.0
70	Yb	ytterbium	(β form) 23.9	24	(β form) 23.9
71	Lu	lutetium	68.6	69	68.6
72	Hf	hafnium	78	78	
73	Ta	tantalum	186	186	
74	W	tungsten	411	411	
75	Re	rhenium	463	463	
77	Ir	iridium	528	528	
78	Pt	platinum	168	168	
79	Au	gold	78	78	
81	Tl	thallium	8	8	
82	Pb	lead	16	16	
83	Bi	bismuth	32	32	
90	Th	thorium	79	79	
92	U	uranium	208	208	
94	Pu	plutonium	96	96	

== Poisson's ratio ==
Poisson's ratio $\nu$ (dimensionless)
number	symbol	name	use	WEL	CRC
4	Be	beryllium	0.032	0.032	
12	Mg	magnesium	0.29	0.29	
13	Al	aluminium	0.35	0.35	
20	Ca	calcium	0.31	0.31	
21	Sc	scandium	0.279	0.28	0.279
22	Ti	titanium	0.32	0.32	
23	V	vanadium	0.37	0.37	
24	Cr	chromium	0.21	0.21	
26	Fe	iron	0.29	0.29	
27	Co	cobalt	0.31	0.31	
28	Ni	nickel	0.31	0.31	
29	Cu	copper	0.34	0.34	
30	Zn	zinc	0.25	0.25	
34	Se	selenium	0.33	0.33	
38	Sr	strontium	0.28	0.28	
39	Y	yttrium	0.243	0.24	0.243
40	Zr	zirconium	0.34	0.34	
41	Nb	niobium	0.40	0.40	
42	Mo	molybdenum	0.31	0.31	
44	Ru	ruthenium	0.30	0.30	
45	Rh	rhodium	0.26	0.26	
46	Pd	palladium	0.39	0.39	
47	Ag	silver	0.37	0.37	
48	Cd	cadmium	0.30	0.30	
50	Sn	tin	0.36	0.36	
57	La	lanthanum	(α form) 0.280	0.28	(α form) 0.280
58	Ce	cerium	(γ form) 0.24	0.24	(γ form) 0.24
59	Pr	praseodymium	(α form) 0.281	0.28	(α form) 0.281
60	Nd	neodymium	(α form) 0.281	0.28	(α form) 0.281
61	Pm	promethium	(α form) est. 0.28	0.28	(α form) est. 0.28
62	Sm	samarium	(α form) 0.274	0.27	(α form) 0.274
63	Eu	europium	0.152	0.15	0.152
64	Gd	gadolinium	(α form) 0.259	0.26	(α form) 0.259
65	Tb	terbium	(α form) 0.261	0.26	(α form) 0.261
66	Dy	dysprosium	(α form) 0.247	0.25	(α form) 0.247
67	Ho	holmium	0.231	0.23	0.231
68	Er	erbium	0.237	0.24	0.237
69	Tm	thulium	0.213	0.21	0.213
70	Yb	ytterbium	(β form) 0.207	0.21	(β form) 0.207
71	Lu	lutetium	0.261	0.26	0.261
72	Hf	hafnium	0.37	0.37	
73	Ta	tantalum	0.34	0.34	
74	W	tungsten	0.28	0.28	
75	Re	rhenium	0.30	0.30	
76	Os	osmium	0.25	0.25	
77	Ir	iridium	0.26	0.26	
78	Pt	platinum	0.38	0.38	
79	Au	gold	0.44	0.44	
81	Tl	thallium	0.45	0.45	
82	Pb	lead	0.44	0.44	
83	Bi	bismuth	0.33	0.33	
90	Th	thorium	0.27	0.27	
92	U	uranium	0.23	0.23	
94	Pu	plutonium	0.21	0.21	

== Bulk modulus ==
Bulk modulus K (GPa)
number	symbol	name	use	WEL	CRC	other
3	Li	lithium	11	11		
4	Be	beryllium	130	130		
5	B	boron	(β form) 185	320		β 185(7) GPa, α 224(15) GPa
6	C	carbon	33	33		
11	Na	sodium	6.3	6.3		
12	Mg	magnesium	45	45		
13	Al	aluminium	76	76		
14	Si	silicon	100	100		
15	P	phosphorus	11	11		
16	S	sulfur	7.7	7.7		
17	Cl	chlorine		(liquid) 1.1		
19	K	potassium	3.1	3.1		
20	Ca	calcium	17	17		
21	Sc	scandium	56.6	57	56.6	
22	Ti	titanium	110	110		
23	V	vanadium	160	160		
24	Cr	chromium	160	160		
25	Mn	manganese	120	120		
26	Fe	iron	170	170		
27	Co	cobalt	180	180		
28	Ni	nickel	180	180		
29	Cu	copper	140	140		
30	Zn	zinc	70	70		
31	Ga	gallium	56			56 average
32	Ge	germanium	75.8			75.8
33	As	arsenic	22	22		
34	Se	selenium	8.3	8.3		
35	Br	bromine		1.9		
37	Rb	rubidium	2.5	2.5		
39	Y	yttrium	41.2	41	41.2	
41	Nb	niobium	170	170		
42	Mo	molybdenum	230	230		
44	Ru	ruthenium	220	220		
45	Rh	rhodium	380	380 (possibly incorrect)		
46	Pd	palladium	180	180		
47	Ag	silver	100	100		
48	Cd	cadmium	42	42		
50	Sn	tin	58	58		
51	Sb	antimony	42	42		
52	Te	tellurium	65	65		
53	I	iodine	7.7	7.7		
55	Cs	caesium	1.6	1.6		
56	Ba	barium	9.6	9.6		
57	La	lanthanum	(α form) 27.9	28	(α form) 27.9	
58	Ce	cerium	(γ form) 21.5	22	(γ form) 21.5	
59	Pr	praseodymium	(α form) 28.8	29	(α form) 28.8	
60	Nd	neodymium	(α form) 31.8	32	(α form) 31.8	
61	Pm	promethium	(α form) est. 33	33	(α form) est. 33	
62	Sm	samarium	(α form) 37.8	38	(α form) 37.8	
63	Eu	europium	8.3	8.3	8.3	
64	Gd	gadolinium	(α form) 37.9	38	(α form) 37.9	
65	Tb	terbium	(α form) 38.7	38.7	(α form) 38.7	
66	Dy	dysprosium	(α form) 40.5	41	(α form) 40.5	
67	Ho	holmium	40.2	40	40.2	
68	Er	erbium	44.4	44	44.4	
69	Tm	thulium	44.5	45	44.5	
70	Yb	ytterbium	(β form) 30.5	31	(β form) 30.5	
71	Lu	lutetium	47.6	48	47.6	
72	Hf	hafnium	110	110		
73	Ta	tantalum	200	200		
74	W	tungsten	310	310		
75	Re	rhenium	370	370		
76	Os	osmium	462			462
77	Ir	iridium	320	320		
78	Pt	platinum	230	230		
79	Au	gold	180	180		
80	Hg	mercury		25		
81	Tl	thallium	43	43		
82	Pb	lead	46	46		
83	Bi	bismuth	31	31		
90	Th	thorium	54	54		
92	U	uranium	100	100		

== Shear modulus ==
Shear modulus G (GPa)
number	symbol	name	use	WEL	CRC
3	Li	lithium	4.2	4.2	
4	Be	beryllium	132	132	
11	Na	sodium	3.3	3.3	
12	Mg	magnesium	17	17	
13	Al	aluminium	26	26	
19	K	potassium	1.3	1.3	
20	Ca	calcium	7.4	7.4	
21	Sc	scandium	29.1	29	29.1
22	Ti	titanium	44	44	
23	V	vanadium	47	47	
24	Cr	chromium	115	115	
25	Mn	manganese	81	81	
26	Fe	iron	82	82	
27	Co	cobalt	75	75	
28	Ni	nickel	76	76	
29	Cu	copper	48	48	
30	Zn	zinc	43	43	
34	Se	selenium	3.7	3.7	
38	Sr	strontium	6.1	6.1	
39	Y	yttrium	25.6	26	25.6
40	Zr	zirconium	33	33	
41	Nb	niobium	38	38	
42	Mo	molybdenum	120	120	
44	Ru	ruthenium	173	173	
45	Rh	rhodium	150	150	
46	Pd	palladium	44	44	
47	Ag	silver	30	30	
48	Cd	cadmium	19	19	
50	Sn	tin	18	18	
51	Sb	antimony	20	20	
52	Te	tellurium	16	16	
56	Ba	barium	4.9	4.9	
57	La	lanthanum	(α form) 14.3	14	(α form) 14.3
58	Ce	cerium	(γ form) 13.5	14	(γ form) 13.5
59	Pr	praseodymium	(α form) 14.8	15	(α form) 14.8
60	Nd	neodymium	(α form) 16.3	16	(α form) 16.3
61	Pm	promethium	(α form) est. 18	18	(α form) est. 18
62	Sm	samarium	(α form) 19.5	20	(α form) 19.5
63	Eu	europium	7.9	7.9	7.9
64	Gd	gadolinium	(α form) 21.8	22	(α form) 21.8
65	Tb	terbium	(α form) 22.1	22	(α form) 22.1
66	Dy	dysprosium	(α form) 24.7	25	(α form) 24.7
67	Ho	holmium	26.3	26	26.3
68	Er	erbium	28.3	28	28.3
69	Tm	thulium	30.5	31	30.5
70	Yb	ytterbium	(β form) 9.9	9.9	(β form) 9.9
71	Lu	lutetium	27.2	27	27.2
72	Hf	hafnium	30	30	
73	Ta	tantalum	69	69	
74	W	tungsten	161	161	
75	Re	rhenium	178	178	
76	Os	osmium	222	222	
77	Ir	iridium	210	210	
78	Pt	platinum	61	61	
79	Au	gold	27	27	
81	Tl	thallium	2.8	2.8	
82	Pb	lead	5.6	5.6	
83	Bi	bismuth	12	12	
90	Th	thorium	31	31	
92	U	uranium	111	111	
94	Pu	plutonium	43	43	
