= Apollo 16 =

Fifth crewed Moon landing

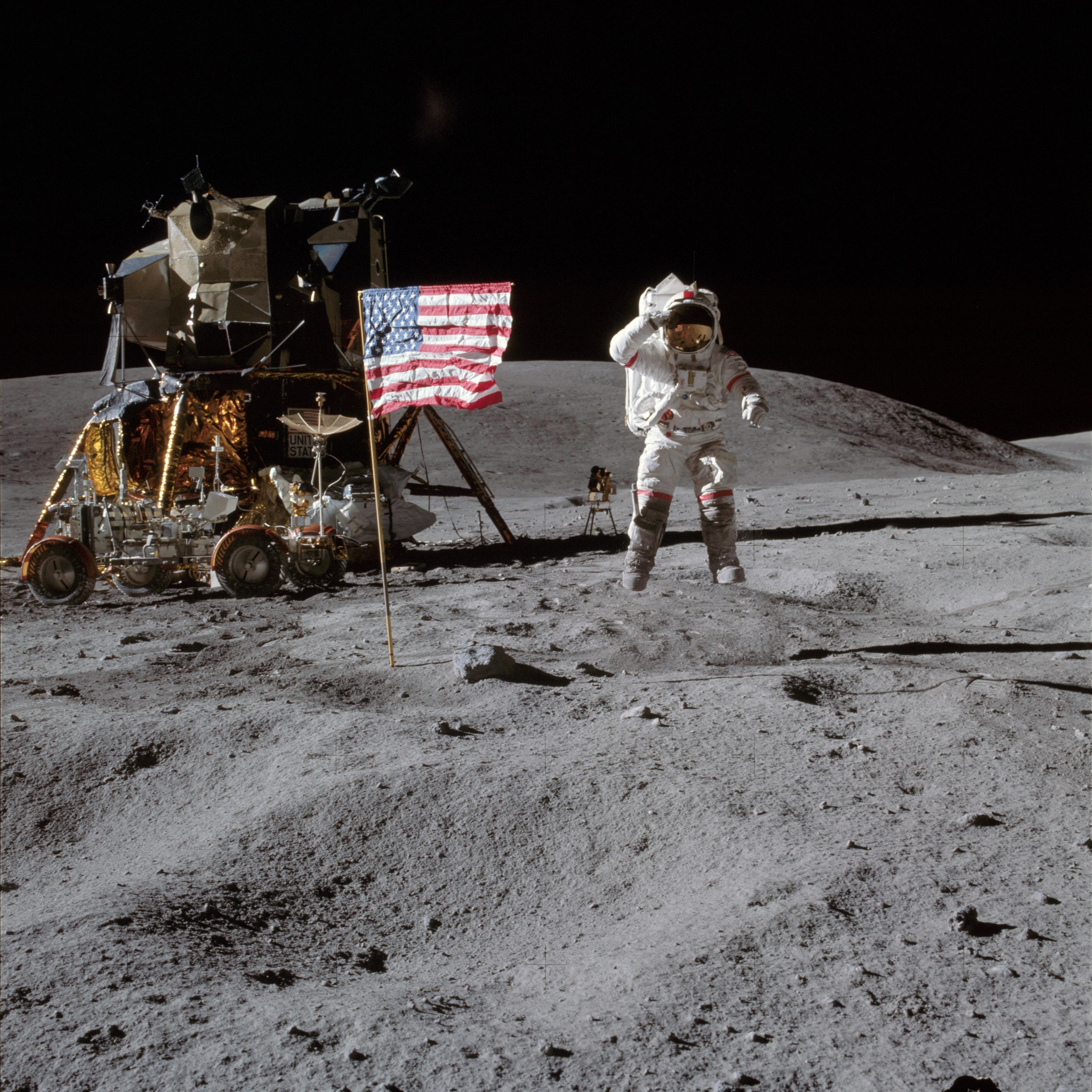
- John Young saluting the United States flag while jumping up on the Moon, with the Apollo Lunar Module Orion and Lunar Roving Vehicle in the background
- Mission type: Crewed lunar landing (J)
- Operator: NASA
- COSPAR ID: CSM: 1972-031A; LM: 1972-031C
- SATCAT no.: CSM: 6000; LM: 6005
- Mission duration: 11 days, 1 hour, 51 minutes, 5 seconds

Spacecraft properties
- Spacecraft: Apollo CSM-113; Apollo LM-11
- Manufacturer: CSM: North American Rockwell; LM: Grumman
- Launch mass: 52,759 kilograms (116,314 lb)
- Landing mass: 5,441 kilograms (11,995 lb)

Crew
- Crew size: 3
- Members: John W. Young; Thomas K. Mattingly II; Charles M. Duke Jr.
- Callsign: CSM: Casper; LM: Orion
- EVAs: 1 in cislunar space to retrieve film cassettes
- EVA duration: 1 h 23 min 42 s

Start of mission
- Launch date: April 16, 1972, 17:54:00 UTC
- Rocket: Saturn V SA-511
- Launch site: Kennedy LC-39A

End of mission
- Recovered by: USS Ticonderoga
- Landing date: April 27, 1972, 19:45:05 UTC
- Landing site: South Pacific Ocean; 0°43′S 156°13′W

Lunar orbiter
- Spacecraft component: Command and service module
- Orbital insertion: April 19, 1972, 20:22:27 UTC
- Orbital departure: April 25, 1972, 02:15:33 UTC
- Orbits: 64

Lunar lander
- Spacecraft component: Lunar Module
- Landing date: April 21, 1972, 02:23:35 UTC
- Return launch: April 24, 1972, 01:25:47 UTC
- Landing site: Descartes Highlands; 8.97301°S 15.50019°E
- Sample mass: 95.71 kilograms (211.0 lb)
- Surface EVAs: 3
- EVA duration: 20 h 14 min 14 s; First: 7 h 11 min 2 s; Second: 7 h 23 min 09 s; Third: 5 h 40 min 3 s

Lunar rover
- Distance driven: 26.7 kilometers (16.6 mi)

Docking with Lunar Module
- Docking date: April 16, 1972, 21:15:53 UTC
- Undocking date: April 20, 1972, 18:07:31 UTC

Docking with Lunar Module Ascent Stage
- Docking date: April 24, 1972, 03:35:18 UTC
- Undocking date: April 24, 1972, 20:54:12 UTC

Payload
- Scientific Instrument Module; Lunar Roving Vehicle
- Mass: SIM: LRV: 210 kilograms (463 lb)
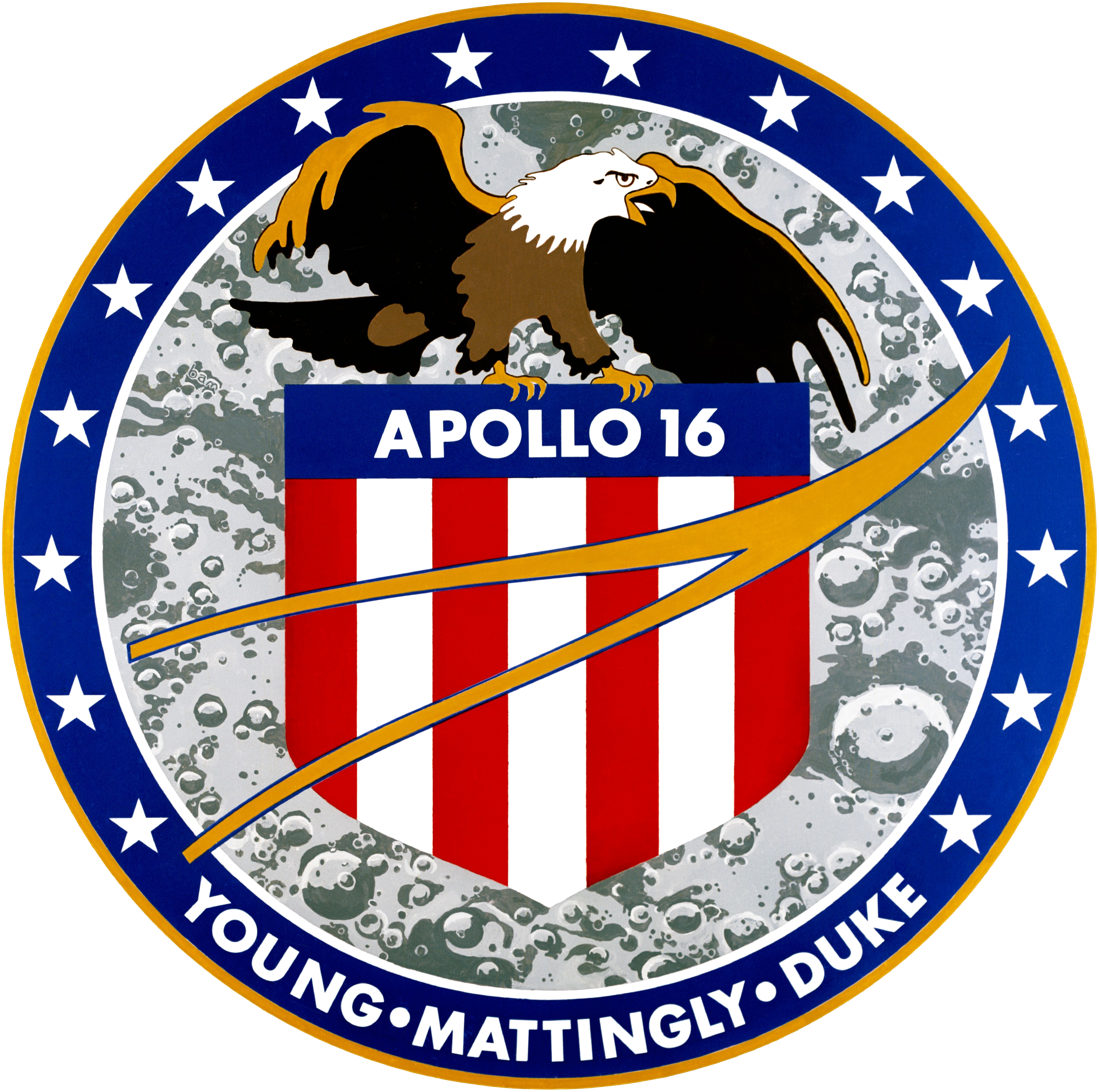
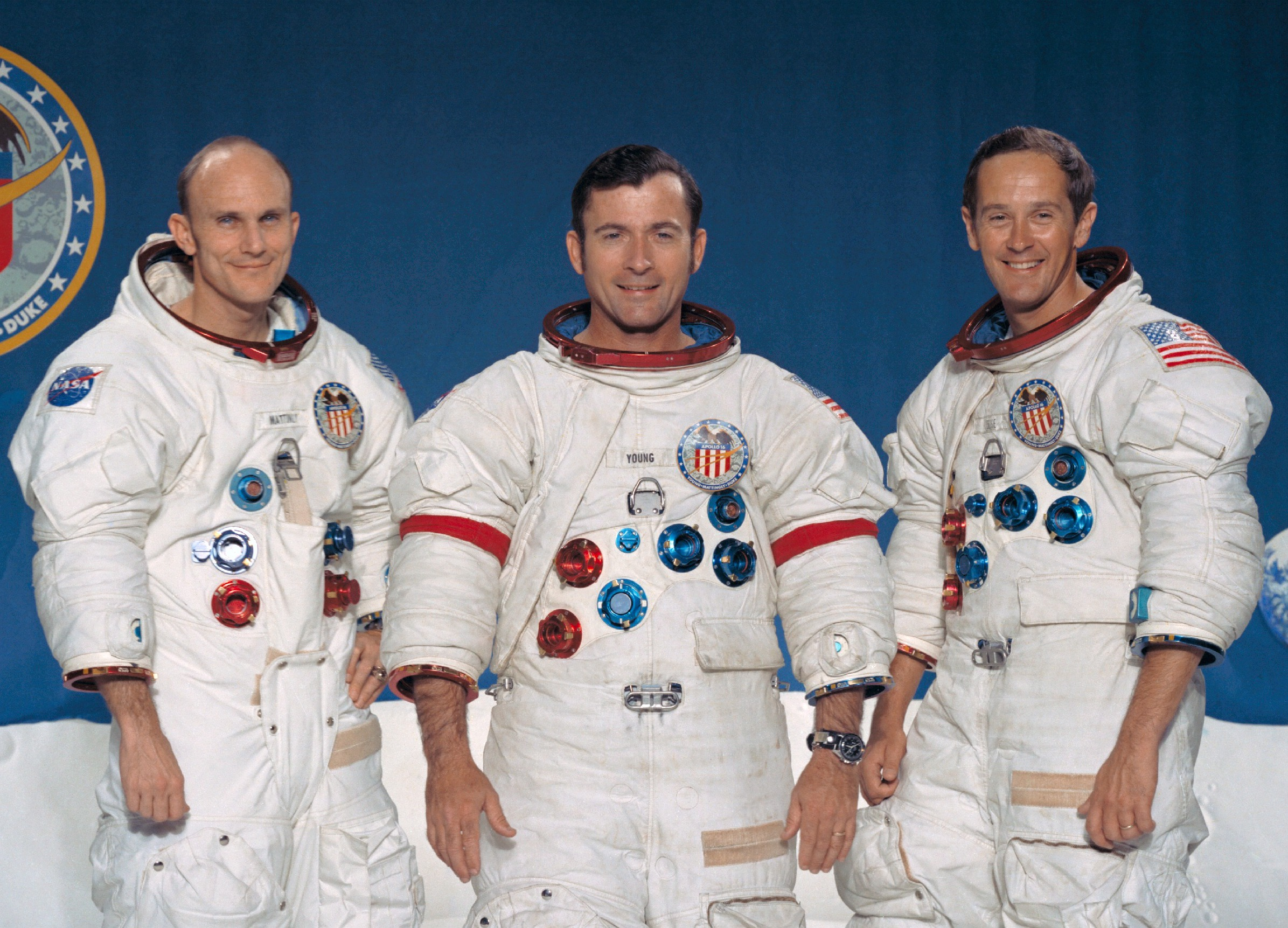
- Left to right: Mattingly, Young, Duke Apollo program

Apollo 16 (April 16–27, 1972) was the tenth crewed mission in the United States Apollo space program, administered by NASA, and the fifth and penultimate to land on the Moon. It was the second of Apollo's "J missions", with an extended stay on the lunar surface, a focus on science, and the use of the Lunar Roving Vehicle (LRV). The landing and exploration were in the Descartes Highlands, a site chosen because some scientists expected it to be an area formed by volcanic action, though this proved not to be the case.

The mission was crewed by Commander John Young, Lunar Module Pilot Charles Duke and Command Module Pilot Ken Mattingly. Launched from the Kennedy Space Center in Florida on April 16, 1972, Apollo 16 experienced a number of minor glitches en route to the Moon. These culminated with a problem with the spacecraft's main engine that resulted in a six-hour delay in the Moon landing as NASA managers contemplated having the astronauts abort the mission and return to Earth, before deciding the problem could be overcome. Although they permitted the lunar landing, NASA had the astronauts return from the mission one day earlier than planned.

After flying the Lunar Module to the Moon's surface on April 21, Young and Duke spent 71 hours—just under three days—on the lunar surface, during which they conducted three extravehicular activities or moonwalks, totaling 20 hours and 14 minutes. The pair drove the lunar rover, the second used on the Moon, for 26.7 kilometers (16.6 mi). On the surface, Young and Duke collected 95.8 kilograms (211 lb) of lunar samples for return to Earth, including Big Muley, the largest Moon rock collected during the Apollo missions. During this time Mattingly orbited the Moon in the command and service module (CSM), taking photos and operating scientific instruments. Mattingly, in the command module, spent 126 hours and 64 revolutions in lunar orbit. After Young and Duke rejoined Mattingly in lunar orbit, the crew released a subsatellite from the service module (SM). During the return trip to Earth, Mattingly performed a one-hour spacewalk to retrieve several film cassettes from the exterior of the service module. Apollo 16 returned safely to Earth on April 27, 1972.

== Crew and key Mission Control personnel ==
Position	Astronaut
Commander (CDR)	John W. Young; Fourth spaceflight
Command Module Pilot (CMP)	Thomas K. Mattingly II; First spaceflight
Lunar Module Pilot (LMP)	Charles M. Duke Jr. Only spaceflight

John Young, the mission commander, was 41 years old and a captain in the Navy at the time of Apollo 16. Becoming an astronaut in 1962 as part of the second group to be selected by NASA, he flew in Gemini 3 with Gus Grissom in 1965, becoming the first American not of the Mercury Seven to fly in space. He thereafter flew in Gemini 10 (1966) with Michael Collins and as command module pilot of Apollo 10 (1969). With Apollo 16, he became the second American, after Jim Lovell, to fly in space four times.

Thomas Kenneth "Ken" Mattingly, the command module pilot, was 36 years old and a lieutenant commander in the Navy at the time of Apollo 16. Mattingly had been selected in NASA's fifth group of astronauts in 1966. He was a member of the support crew for Apollo 8 and Apollo 9. Mattingly then undertook parallel training with Apollo 11's backup CMP, William Anders, who had announced his resignation from NASA effective at the end of July 1969 and would thus be unavailable if the first lunar landing mission was postponed. Had Anders left NASA before Apollo 11 flew, Mattingly would have taken his place on the backup crew.

Mattingly had originally been assigned to the prime crew of Apollo 13, but was exposed to rubella through Charles Duke, at that time with Young on Apollo 13's backup crew; Duke had caught it from one of his children. Mattingly never contracted the illness, but three days before launch was removed from the crew and replaced by his backup, Jack Swigert. Duke, also a Group 5 astronaut and a space rookie, had served on the support crew of Apollo 10 and was a capsule communicator (CAPCOM) for Apollo 11. A lieutenant colonel in the Air Force, Duke was 36 years old at the time of Apollo 16, which made him the youngest of the twelve astronauts who walked on the Moon during Apollo as of the time of the mission. All three men were announced as the prime crew of Apollo 16 on March 3, 1971.

Apollo 16's backup crew consisted of Fred W. Haise Jr. (commander, who had flown on Apollo 13), Stuart A. Roosa (CMP, who had flown on Apollo 14) and Edgar D. Mitchell (LMP, also Apollo 14). Although not officially announced, Director of Flight Crew Operations Deke Slayton, the astronauts' supervisor, had originally planned to have a backup crew of Haise as commander, William R. Pogue (CMP) and Gerald P. Carr (LMP), who were targeted to become the prime crew on Apollo 19. However, after the cancellations of Apollos 18 and 19 were announced in September 1970, it made more sense to use astronauts who had already flown lunar missions as backups, rather than training others on what would likely be a dead-end assignment. Subsequently, Roosa and Mitchell were assigned to the backup crew, while Pogue and Carr were reassigned to the Skylab program where they flew on Skylab 4.

For projects Mercury and Gemini, a prime and a backup crew had been designated, but for Apollo, a third group of astronauts, known as the support crew, was also designated. Slayton created the support crews early in the Apollo Program on the advice of Apollo crew commander James McDivitt, who would lead Apollo 9. McDivitt believed that, with preparation going on in facilities across the U.S., meetings that needed a member of the flight crew would be missed. Support crew members were to assist as directed by the mission commander. Usually low in seniority, they assembled the mission's rules, flight plan, and checklists, and kept them updated. For Apollo 16, they were: Anthony W. England, Karl G. Henize, Henry W. Hartsfield Jr., Robert F. Overmyer and Donald H. Peterson.

Flight directors were Pete Frank and Philip Shaffer, first shift, Gene Kranz and Donald R. Puddy, second shift, and Gerry Griffin, Neil B. Hutchinson and Charles R. Lewis, third shift. Flight directors during Apollo had a one-sentence job description: "The flight director may take any actions necessary for crew safety and mission success." CAPCOMs were Haise, Roosa, Mitchell, James B. Irwin, England, Peterson, Hartsfield, and C. Gordon Fullerton.

== Mission insignia and call signs ==
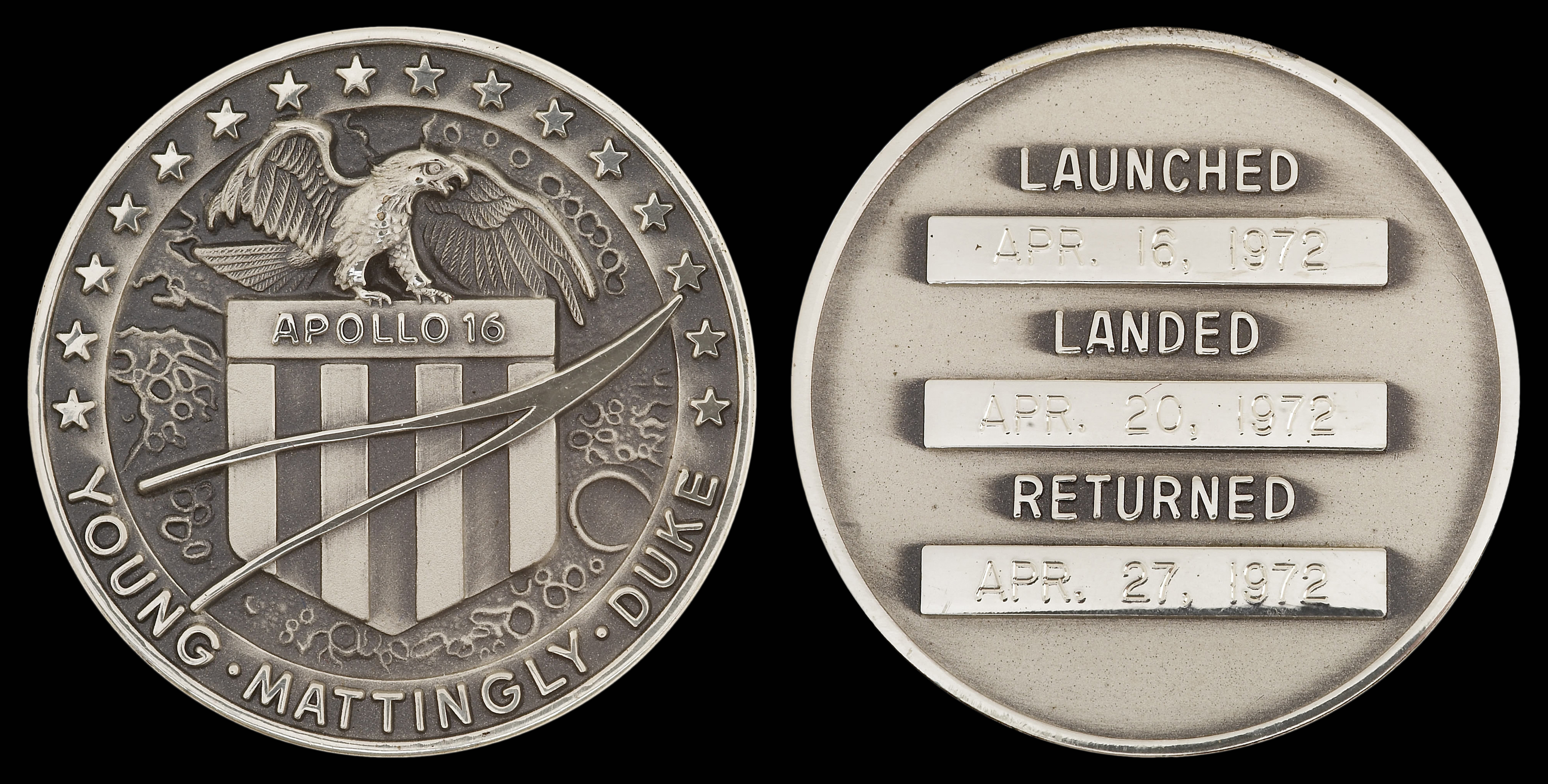
Apollo 16 space-flown silver Robbins medallion

The insignia of Apollo 16 is dominated by a rendering of an American eagle and a red, white and blue shield, representing the people of the United States, over a gray background representing the lunar surface. Overlaying the shield is a gold NASA vector, orbiting the Moon. On its gold-outlined blue border, there are 16 stars, representing the mission number, and the names of the crew members: Young, Mattingly, Duke. The insignia was designed from ideas originally submitted by the crew of the mission, by Barbara Matelski of the graphics shop at the Manned Spacecraft Center in Houston.

Young and Duke chose "Orion" for the Lunar Module's call sign, while Mattingly chose "Casper" for the command and service module. According to Duke, he and Young chose "Orion" for the LM because they wanted something connected with the stars. Orion is one of the brightest constellations as seen from Earth, and one visible to the astronauts throughout their journey. Duke also stated, "it is a prominent constellation and easy to pronounce and transmit to Mission Control". Mattingly said he chose "Casper", evoking Casper the Friendly Ghost, because "there are enough serious things in this flight, so I picked a non-serious name."

== Planning and training ==
=== Landing site selection ===
Apollo 16 was the second of Apollo's J missions, featuring the use of the Lunar Roving Vehicle, increased scientific capability, and three-day lunar surface stays. As Apollo 16 was the penultimate mission in the Apollo program and there was no major new hardware or procedures to test on the lunar surface, the last two missions (the other being Apollo 17) presented opportunities for astronauts to clear up some of the uncertainties in understanding the Moon's characteristics. Scientists sought information on the Moon's early history, which might be obtained from its ancient surface features, the lunar highlands. Previous Apollo expeditions, including Apollo 14 and Apollo 15, had obtained samples of pre-mare lunar material, likely thrown from the highlands by meteorite impacts. These were dated from before lava began to upwell from the Moon's interior and flood the low areas and basins. Nevertheless, no Apollo mission had actually visited the lunar highlands.

Apollo 14 had visited and sampled a ridge of material ejected by the impact that created the Mare Imbrium impact basin. Likewise, Apollo 15 had also sampled material in the region of Imbrium, visiting the basin's edge. Because the Apollo 14 and Apollo 15 landing sites were closely associated with the Imbrium basin, there was still the chance that different geologic processes were prevalent in areas of the lunar highlands far from Mare Imbrium. Scientist Dan Milton, studying photographs of the highlands from Lunar Orbiter photographs, saw an area in the Descartes region of the Moon with unusually high albedo that he theorized might be due to volcanic rock; his theory quickly gained wide support. Several members of the scientific community noted that the central lunar highlands resembled regions on Earth that were created by volcanism processes and hypothesized the same might be true on the Moon. They hoped scientific output from the Apollo 16 mission would provide an answer. Some scientists advocated for a landing near the large crater, Tycho, but its distance from the lunar equator and the fact that the Lunar Module would have to approach over very rough terrain ruled it out.

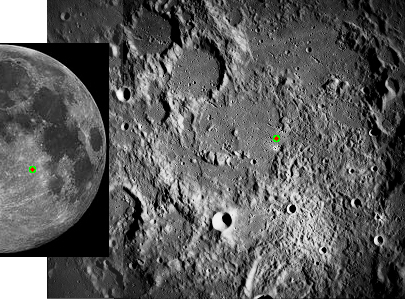
Location of the Apollo 16 landing site

The Ad Hoc Apollo Site Evaluation Committee met in April and May 1971 to decide the Apollo 16 and 17 landing sites; it was chaired by Noel Hinners of Bellcomm. There was consensus the final landing sites should be in the lunar highlands, and among the sites considered for Apollo 16 were the Descartes Highlands region west of Mare Nectaris and the crater Alphonsus. The considerable distance between the Descartes site and previous Apollo landing sites would also be beneficial for the network of seismometers, deployed on each landing mission beginning with Apollo 12.

At Alphonsus, three scientific objectives were determined to be of primary interest and paramount importance: the possibility of old, pre-Imbrium impact material from within the crater's wall, the composition of the crater's interior and the possibility of past volcanic activity on the floor of the crater at several smaller "dark halo" craters. Geologists feared, however, that samples obtained from the crater might have been contaminated by the Imbrium impact, thus preventing Apollo 16 from obtaining samples of pre-Imbrium material. There also remained the distinct possibility that this objective would have already been satisfied by the Apollo 14 and Apollo 15 missions, as the Apollo 14 samples had not yet been completely analyzed and samples from Apollo 15 had not yet been obtained.

On June 3, 1971, the site selection committee decided to target the Apollo 16 mission for the Descartes site. Following the decision, the Alphonsus site was considered the most likely candidate for Apollo 17, but was eventually rejected. With the assistance of orbital photography obtained on the Apollo 14 mission, the Descartes site was determined to be safe enough for a crewed landing. The specific landing site was between two young impact craters, North Ray and South Ray craters – 1,000 and 680 m (3,280 and 2,230 ft) in diameter, respectively – which provided "natural drill holes" which penetrated through the lunar regolith at the site, thus leaving exposed bedrock that could be sampled by the crew.

After the selection, mission planners made the Descartes and Cayley formations, two geologic units of the lunar highlands, the primary sampling interest of the mission. It was these formations that the scientific community widely suspected were formed by lunar volcanism, but this hypothesis was proven incorrect by the composition of lunar samples from the mission.

=== Training ===
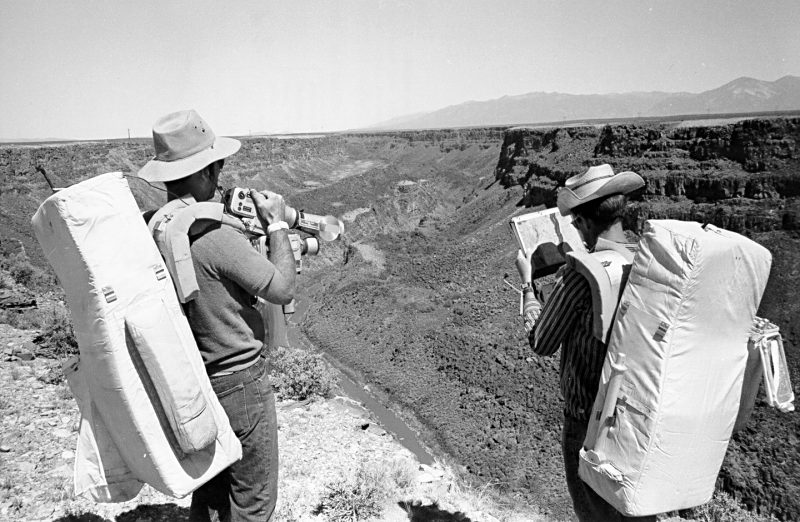
John Young and Charles Duke training at the Rio Grande Gorge in New Mexico

In addition to the usual Apollo spacecraft training, Young and Duke, along with backup commander Fred Haise, underwent an extensive geological training program that included several field trips to introduce them to concepts and techniques they would use in analyzing features and collecting samples on the lunar surface. During these trips, they visited and provided scientific descriptions of geologic features they were likely to encounter. The backup LMP, Mitchell, was unavailable during the early part of the training, occupied with tasks relating to Apollo 14, but by September 1971 had joined the geology field trips. Before that, Tony England (a member of the support crew and the lunar EVA CAPCOM) or one of the geologist trainers would train alongside Haise on geology field trips.

Since Descartes was believed to be volcanic, a good deal of this training was geared towards volcanic rocks and features, but field trips were made to sites featuring other sorts of rock. As Young later commented, the non-volcanic training proved more useful, given that Descartes did not prove to be volcanic. In July 1971, they visited Sudbury, Ontario, Canada, for geology training exercises, the first time U.S. astronauts trained in Canada. The Apollo 14 landing crew had visited a site in West Germany; geologist Don Wilhelms related that unspecified incidents there had caused Slayton to rule out further European training trips. Geologists chose Sudbury because of a 97 km (60 mi) wide crater created about 1.8 billion years ago by a large meteorite. The Sudbury Basin shows evidence of shatter cone geology, familiarizing the Apollo crew with geologic evidence of a meteorite impact. During the training exercises the astronauts did not wear space suits, but carried radio equipment to converse with each other and England, practicing procedures they would use on the lunar surface. By the end of the training, the field trips had become major exercises, involving up to eight astronauts and dozens of support personnel, attracting coverage from the media. For the exercise at the Nevada Test Site, where the massive craters left by nuclear explosions simulated the large craters to be found on the Moon, all participants had to have security clearance and a listed next-of-kin, and an overflight by CMP Mattingly required special permission.

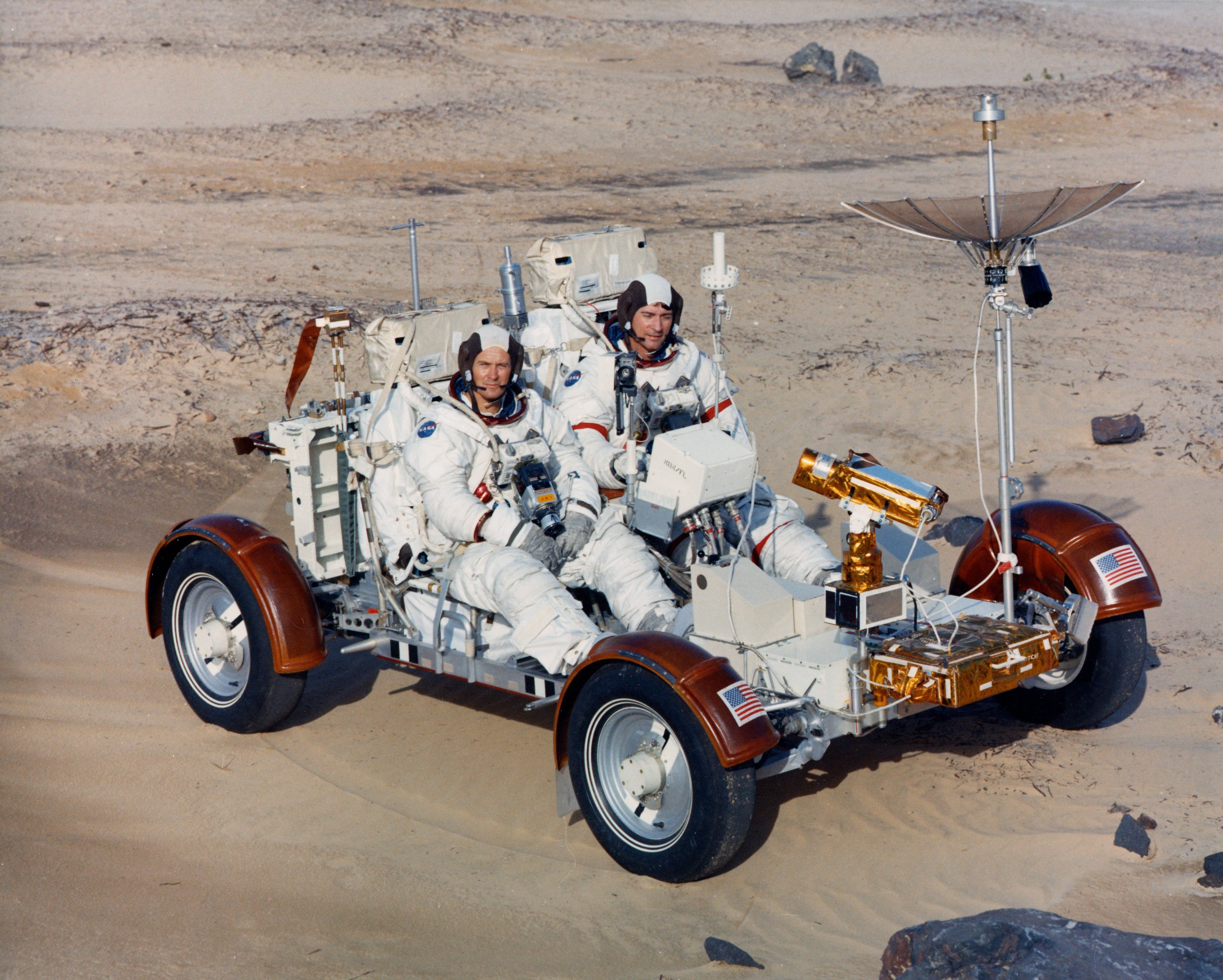
Young (right) and Duke training to drive the Lunar Roving Vehicle

In addition to the field geology training, Young and Duke also trained to use their EVA space suits, adapt to the reduced lunar gravity, collect samples, and drive the Lunar Roving Vehicle. The fact that they had been backups for Apollo 13, planned to be a landing mission, meant that they could spend about 40 percent of their time training for their surface operations. They also received survival training and prepared for technical aspects of the mission. The astronauts spent much time studying the lunar samples brought back by earlier missions, learning about the instruments to be carried on the mission, and hearing what the principal investigators in charge of those instruments expected to learn from Apollo 16. This training helped Young and Duke, while on the Moon, quickly realize that the expected volcanic rocks were not there, even though the geologists in Mission Control initially did not believe them. Much of the training—according to Young, 350 hours—was conducted with the crew wearing space suits, something that Young deemed vital, allowing the astronauts to know the limitations of the equipment in doing their assigned tasks. Mattingly also received training in recognizing geological features from orbit by flying over the field areas in an airplane, and trained to operate the Scientific Instrument Module from lunar orbit.

== Equipment ==
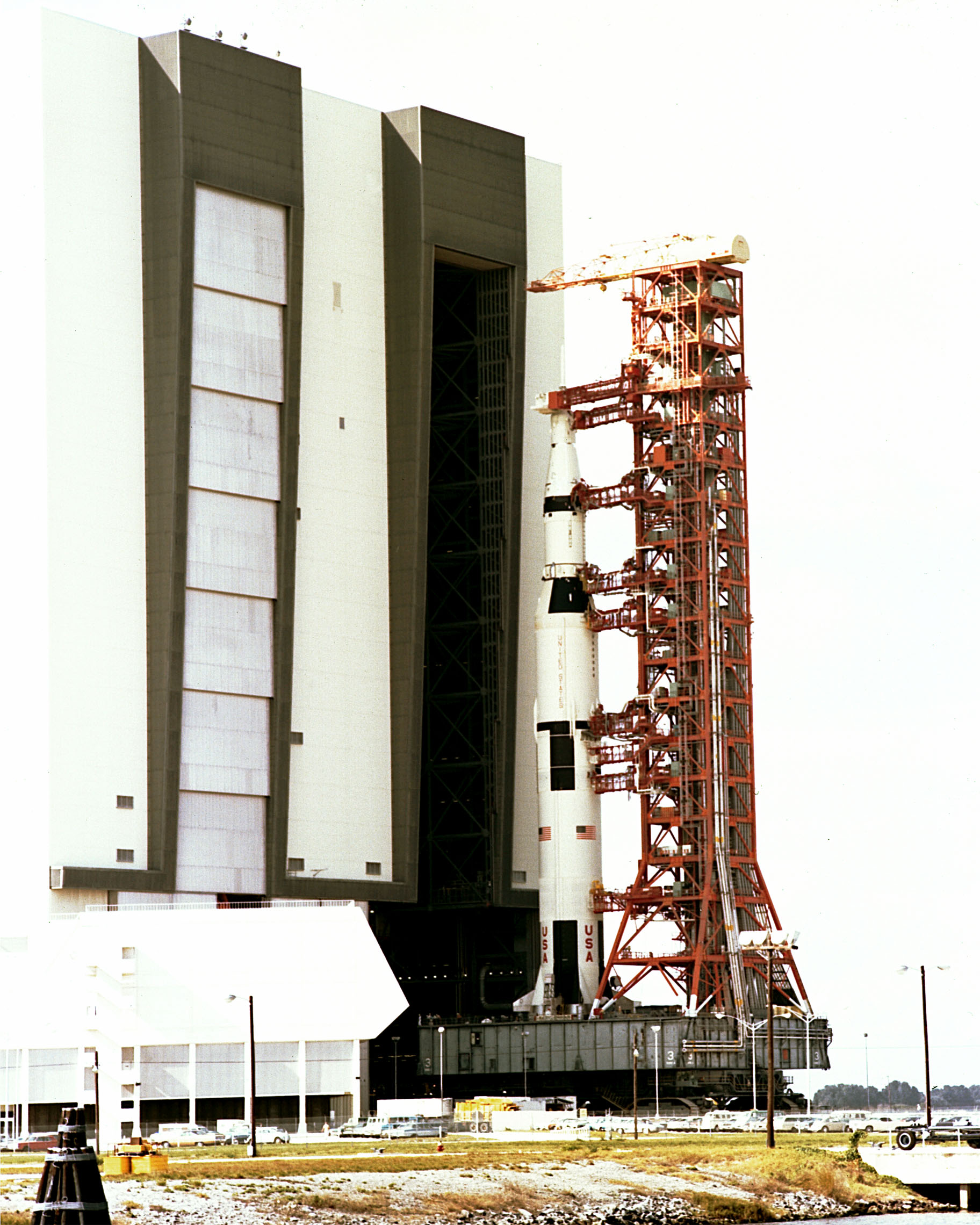
Apollo 16's launch vehicle by the Vehicle Assembly Building, January 27, 1972

=== Launch vehicle ===
The launch vehicle which took Apollo 16 to the Moon was a Saturn V, designated as AS-511. This was the eleventh Saturn V to be flown and the ninth used on crewed missions. Apollo 16's Saturn V was almost identical to Apollo 15's. One change that was made was the restoration of four retrorockets to the S-IC first stage, meaning there would be a total of eight, as on Apollo 14 and earlier. The retrorockets were used to minimize the risk of collision between the jettisoned first stage and the Saturn V. These four retrorockets had been omitted from Apollo 15's Saturn V to save weight, but analysis of Apollo 15's flight showed that the S-IC came closer than expected after jettison, and it was feared that if there were only four rockets and one failed, there might be a collision.

=== ALSEP and other surface equipment ===
As on all lunar landing missions after Apollo 11, an Apollo Lunar Surface Experiments Package (ALSEP) was flown on Apollo 16. This was a suite of nuclear-powered experiments designed to keep functioning after the astronauts who set them up returned to Earth. Apollo 16's ALSEP consisted of a Passive Seismic Experiment (PSE, a seismometer), an Active Seismic Experiment (ASE), a Lunar Heat Flow Experiment (HFE), and a Lunar Surface Magnetometer (LSM). The ALSEP was powered by a SNAP-27 radioisotope thermoelectric generator, developed by the Atomic Energy Commission.

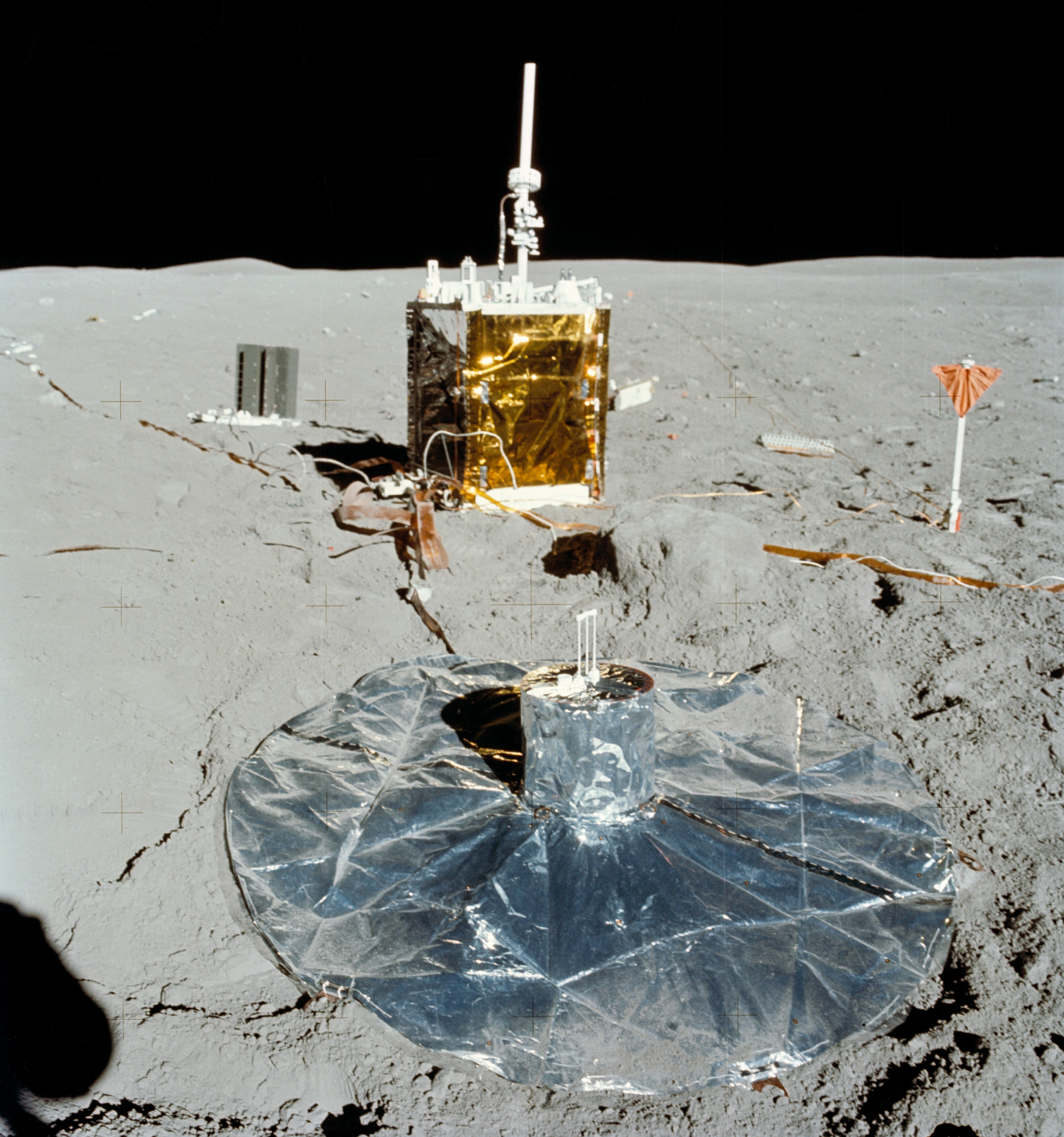
Apollo 16's Passive Seismic Experiment

The PSE added to the network of seismometers left by Apollo 12, 14 and 15. NASA intended to calibrate the Apollo 16 PSE by crashing the LM's ascent stage near it after the astronauts were done with it, an object of known mass and velocity impacting at a known location. However, NASA lost control of the ascent stage after jettison, and this did not occur. The ASE, designed to return data about the Moon's geologic structure, consisted of two groups of explosives: one, a line of "thumpers" were to be deployed attached to three geophones. The thumpers would be exploded during the ALSEP deployment. A second group was four mortars of different sizes, to be set off remotely once the astronauts had returned to Earth. Apollo 14 had also carried an ASE, though its mortars were never set off for fear of affecting other experiments.

The HFE involved the drilling of two 3.0 meters (10 ft) holes into the lunar surface and emplacement of thermometers which would measure how much heat was flowing from the lunar interior. This was the third attempt to emplace a HFE: the first flew on Apollo 13 and never reached the lunar surface, while on Apollo 15, problems with the drill meant the probes did not go as deep as planned. The Apollo 16 attempt would fail after Duke had successfully emplaced the first probe; Young, unable to see his feet in the bulky spacesuit, pulled out and severed the cable after it wrapped around his leg. NASA managers vetoed a repair attempt due to the amount of time it would take. A HFE flew, and was deployed, on Apollo 17.

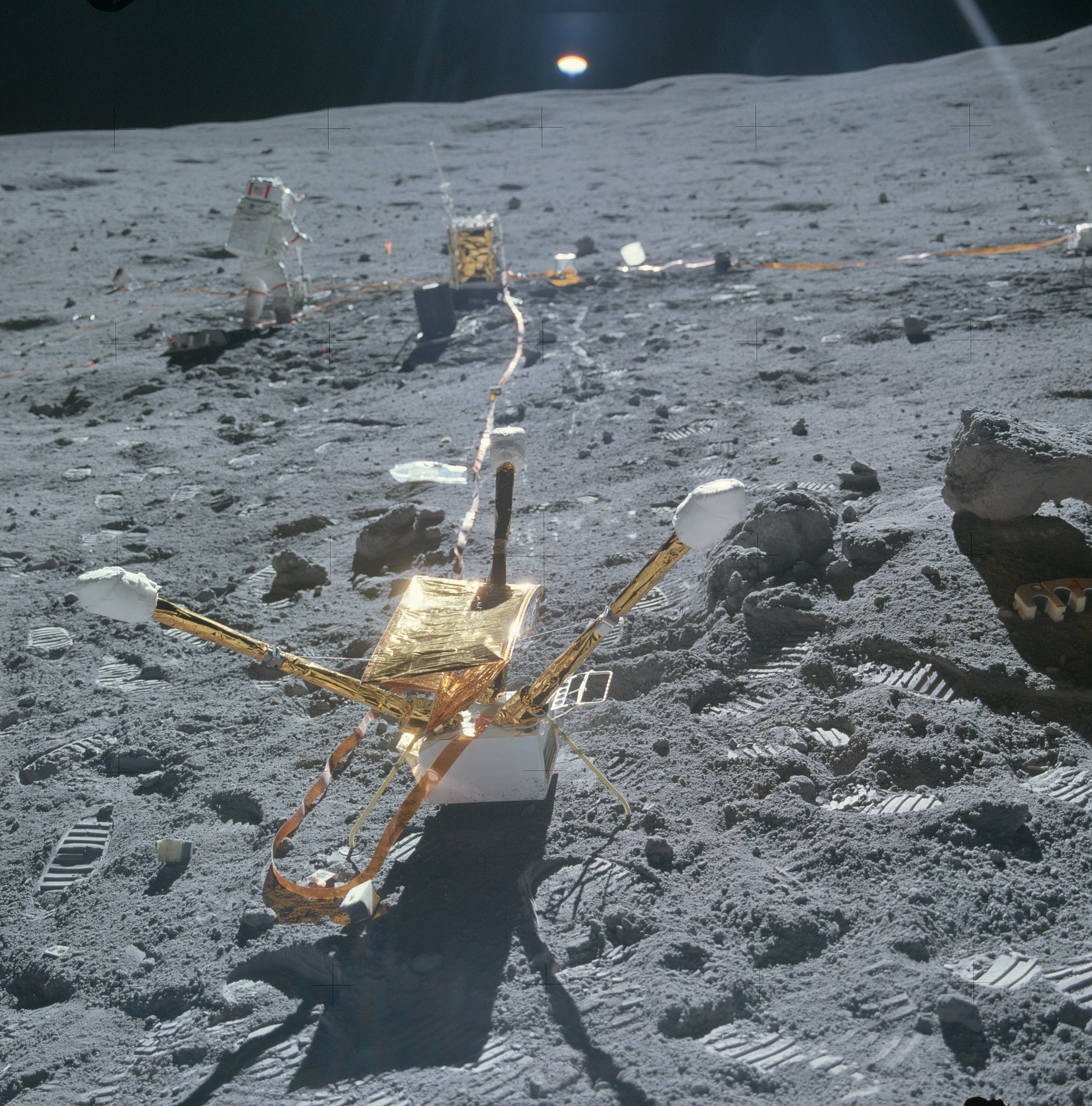
The Lunar Surface Magnetometer

The LSM was designed to measure the strength of the Moon's magnetic field, which is only a small fraction of Earth's. Additional data would be returned by the use of the Lunar Portable Magnetometer (LPM), to be carried on the lunar rover and activated at several geology stops. Scientists also hoped to learn from an Apollo 12 sample, to be briefly returned to the Moon on Apollo 16, from which "soft" magnetism had been removed, to see if it had been restored on its journey. Measurements after the mission found that "soft" magnetism had returned to the sample, although at a lower intensity than before.

A Far Ultraviolet Camera/Spectrograph (UVC) was flown, the first astronomical observations taken from the Moon, seeking data on hydrogen sources in space without the masking effect of the Earth's corona. The instrument was placed in the LM's shadow and pointed at nebulae, other astronomical objects, the Earth itself, and any suspected volcanic vents seen on the lunar surface. The film was returned to Earth. When asked to summarize the results for a general audience, Dr. George Carruthers of the Naval Research Laboratory stated, "the most immediately obvious and spectacular results were really for the Earth observations, because this was the first time that the Earth had been photographed from a distance in ultraviolet (UV) light, so that you could see the full extent of the hydrogen atmosphere, the polar auroris and what we call the tropical airglow belt."

Four panels mounted on the LM's descent stage comprised the Cosmic Ray Detector, designed to record cosmic ray and solar wind particles. Three of the panels were left uncovered during the voyage to the Moon, with the fourth uncovered by the crew early in the EVA. The panels would be bagged for return to Earth. The free-standing Solar Wind Composition Experiment flew on Apollo 16, as it had on each of the lunar landings, for deployment on the lunar surface and return to Earth. Platinum foil was added to the aluminum of the previous experiments, to minimize contamination.

=== Particles and Fields Subsatellite PFS-2 ===
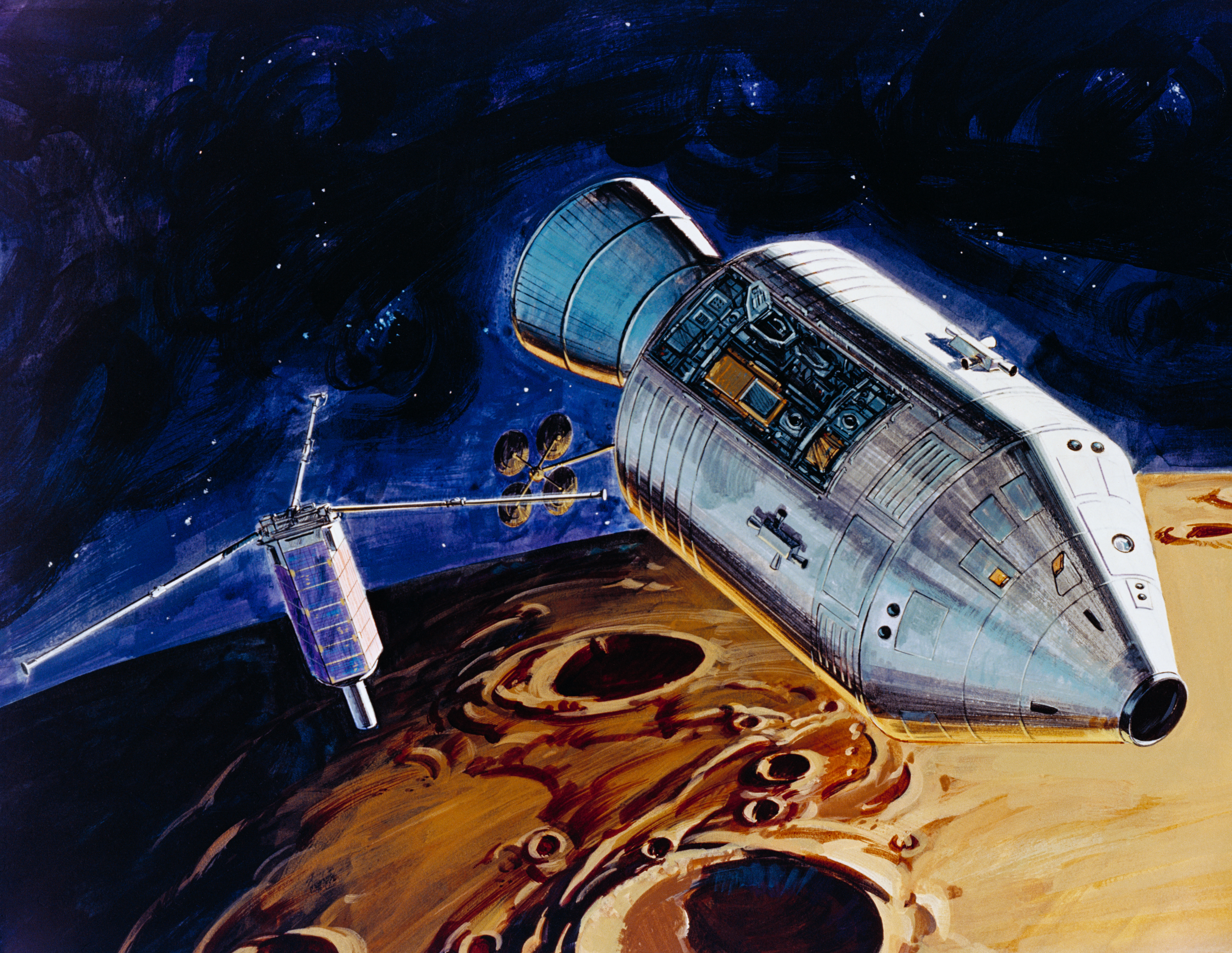
Artist's conception of subsatellite deployment

The Apollo 16 Particles and Fields Subsatellite (PFS-2) was a small satellite released into lunar orbit from the service module. Its principal objective was to measure charged particles and magnetic fields all around the Moon as the Moon orbited Earth, similar to its sister spacecraft, PFS-1, released eight months earlier by Apollo 15. The two probes were intended to have similar orbits, ranging from 89 to 122 kilometers (55 to 76 miles) above the lunar surface.

Like the Apollo 15 subsatellite, PFS-2 was expected to have a lifetime of at least a year before its orbit decayed and it crashed onto the lunar surface. The decision to bring Apollo 16 home early after there were difficulties with the main engine meant that the spacecraft did not go to the orbit which had been planned for PFS-2. Instead, it was ejected into a lower-than-planned orbit and crashed into the Moon a month later on May 29, 1972, after circling the Moon 424 times. This brief lifetime was because lunar mascons were near to its orbital ground track and helped pull PFS-2 into the Moon.

== Mission events ==
Apollo 16: Nothing So Hidden (1972) Official NASA information film reel.

Elements of the spacecraft and launch vehicle began arriving at Kennedy Space Center in July 1970, and all had arrived by September 1971. Apollo 16 was originally scheduled to launch on March 17, 1972. One of the bladders for the CM's reaction control system burst during testing. This issue, in combination with concerns that one of the explosive cords that would jettison the LM from the CSM after the astronauts returned from the lunar surface would not work properly, and a problem with Duke's spacesuit, made it desirable to slip the launch to the next launch window. Thus, Apollo 16 was postponed to April 16. The launch vehicle stack, which had been rolled out from the Vehicle Assembly Building on December 13, 1971, was returned thereto on January 27, 1972. It was rolled out again to Launch Complex 39A on February 9.

The official mission countdown began on Monday, April 10, 1972, at 8:30 am, six days before the launch. At this point the Saturn V rocket's three stages were powered up, and drinking water was pumped into the spacecraft. As the countdown began, the crew of Apollo 16 was participating in final training exercises in anticipation of a launch on April 16. The astronauts underwent their final preflight physical examination on April 11. The only holds in the countdown were the ones pre-planned in the schedule, and the weather was fair as the time for launch approached.

=== Launch and outward journey ===
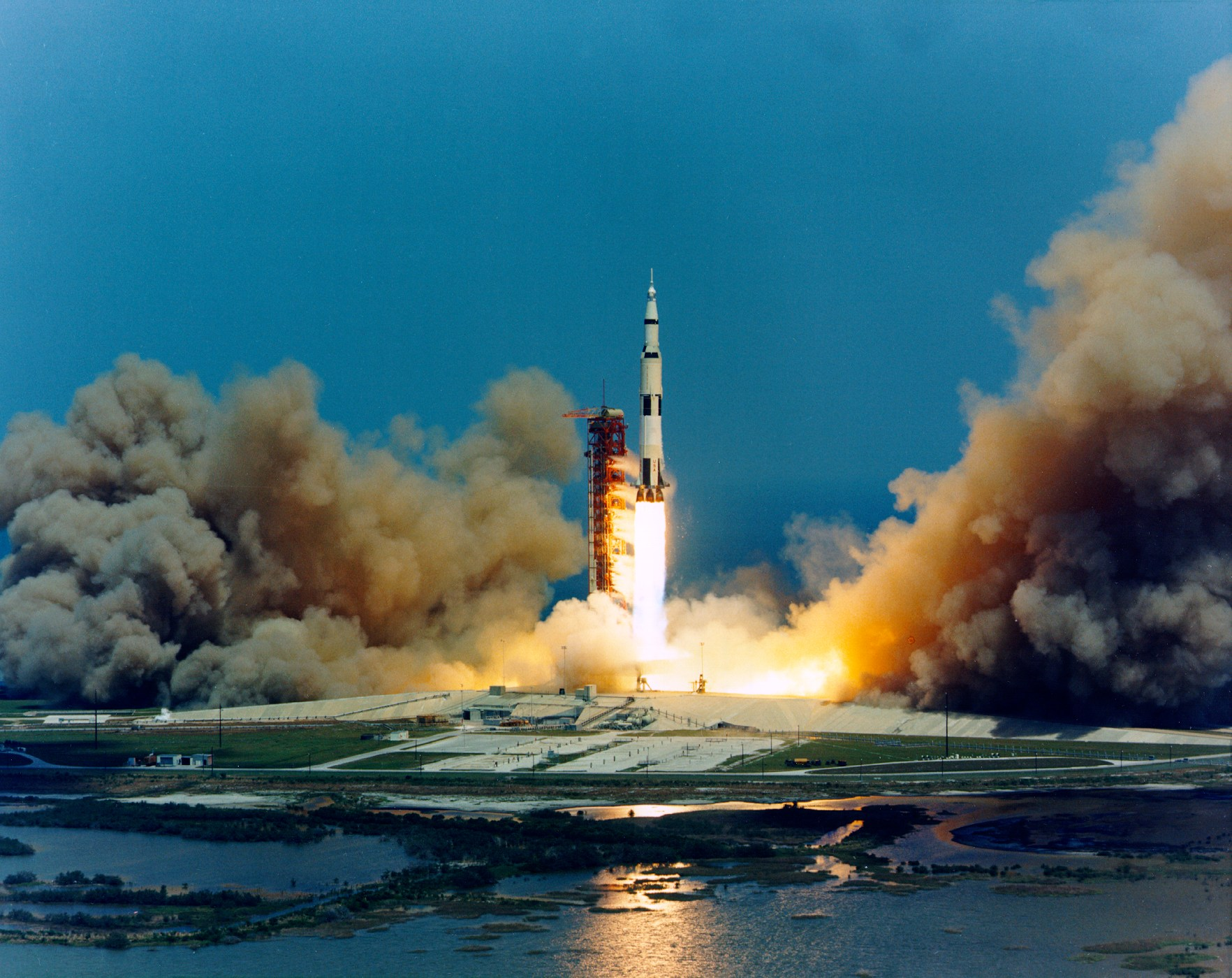
Launch of Apollo 16

The Apollo 16 mission launched from the Kennedy Space Center in Florida at 12:54 pm EST on April 16, 1972. The launch was nominal; the crew experienced vibration similar to that on previous missions. The first and second stages of the Saturn V (the S-IC and S-II) performed nominally; the spacecraft entered orbit around Earth just under 12 minutes after lift-off.

After reaching orbit, the crew spent time adapting to the zero-gravity environment and preparing the spacecraft for trans-lunar injection (TLI), the burn of the third-stage rocket that would propel them to the Moon. In Earth orbit, the crew faced minor technical issues, including a potential problem with the environmental control system and the S-IVB third stage's attitude control system, but eventually resolved or compensated for them as they prepared to depart towards the Moon.

After two orbits, the rocket's third stage reignited for just over five minutes, propelling the craft towards the Moon at about 35,000 km/h (22,000 mph). Six minutes after the burn of the S-IVB, the command and service modules (CSM), containing the crew, separated from the rocket and traveled 49 ft (15 m) away from it before turning around and retrieving the lunar module from inside the expended rocket stage. The maneuver, performed by Mattingly and known as transposition, docking, and extraction, went smoothly.

Following transposition and docking, the crew noticed the exterior surface of the Lunar Module was giving off particles from a spot where the LM's skin appeared torn or shredded; at one point, Duke estimated they were seeing about five to ten particles per second. Young and Duke entered the Lunar Module through the docking tunnel connecting it with the command module to inspect its systems, at which time they did not spot any major issues.

Once on course towards the Moon, the crew put the spacecraft into a rotisserie "barbecue" mode in which the craft rotated along its long axis three times per hour to ensure even heat distribution about the spacecraft from the Sun. After further preparing the craft for the voyage, the crew began the first sleep period of the mission just under 15 hours after launch.

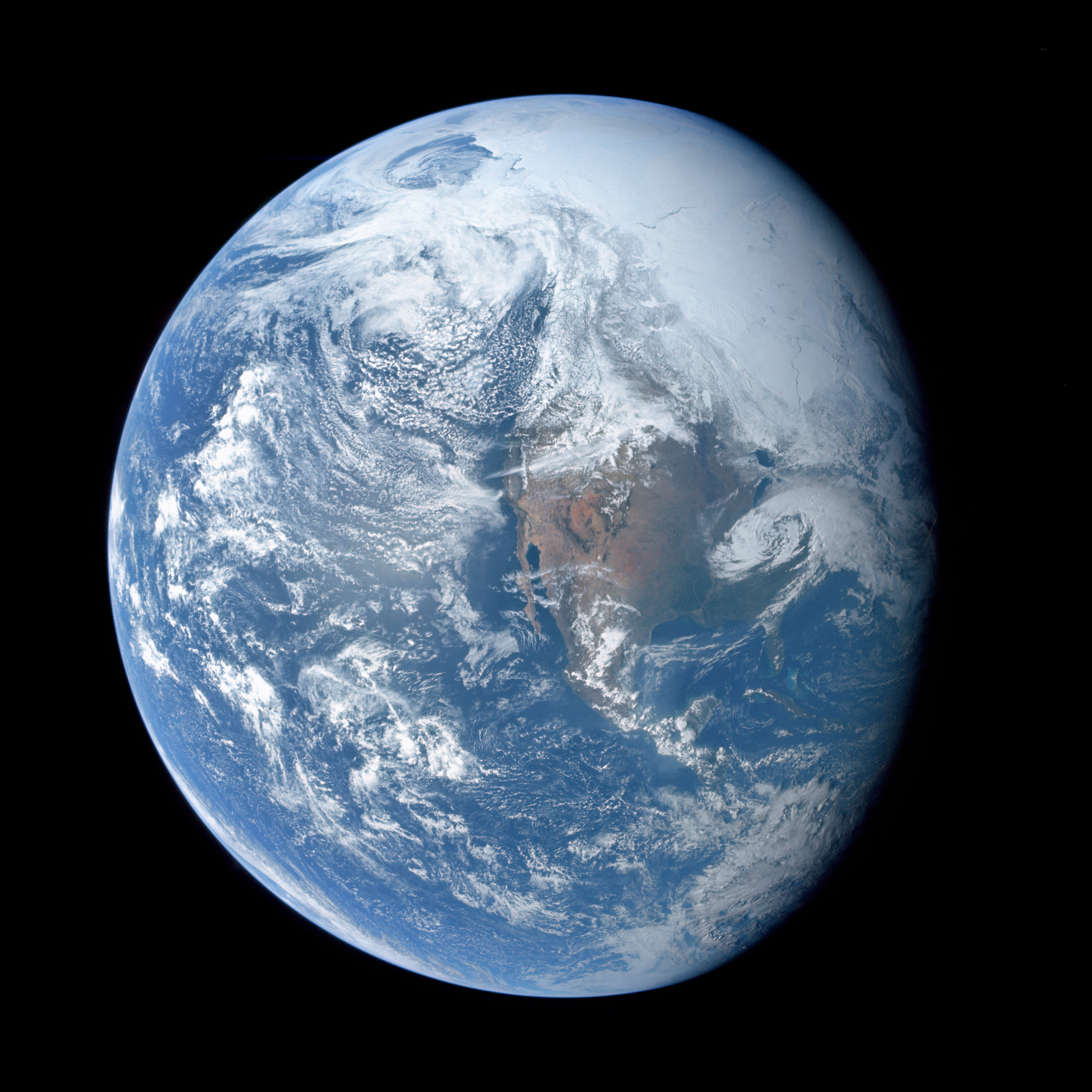
Earth famous photograph (AS16-118-18885) from Apollo 16 was taken by Charles Duke by his own account, during the trans-lunar coast, showing the US at center

By the time Mission Control issued the wake-up call to the crew for flight day two, the spacecraft was about 112,220 miles or 181,000 kilometers (98,000 nmi) away from the Earth, traveling at about 1.622 km/s (5,322 ft/s). As it was not due to arrive in lunar orbit until flight day four, flight days two and three were largely preparatory, consisting of spacecraft maintenance and scientific research. On day two, the crew performed an electrophoresis experiment, also performed on Apollo 14, in which they attempted to demonstrate that electrophoretic separation in their near-weightless environment could be used to produce substances of greater purity than would be possible on Earth. Using two different sizes of polystyrene particles, one size colored red and one blue, separation of the two types via electrophoresis was achieved, though electro-osmosis in the experiment equipment prevented the clear separation of two particle bands.

The remainder of day two included a two-second mid-course correction burn performed by the CSM's service propulsion system (SPS) engine to tweak the spacecraft's trajectory. Later in the day, the astronauts entered the Lunar Module for the second time to further inspect the landing craft's systems. The crew reported they had observed additional paint peeling from a portion of the LM's outer aluminum skin. Despite this, the crew discovered that the spacecraft's systems were performing nominally. Following the LM inspection, the crew reviewed checklists and procedures for the following days in anticipation of their arrival and the Lunar Orbit Insertion (LOI) burn. Command Module Pilot Mattingly reported "gimbal lock", meaning that the system to keep track of the craft's attitude was no longer accurate. Mattingly had to realign the guidance system using the Sun and Moon. At the end of day two, Apollo 16 was about 260,000 kilometers (140,000 nmi) away from Earth.

When the astronauts were awakened for flight day three, the spacecraft was about 291,000 kilometers (157,000 nmi) away from the Earth. The velocity of the craft steadily decreased, as it had not yet reached the lunar sphere of gravitational influence. The early part of day three was largely housekeeping, spacecraft maintenance and exchanging status reports with Mission Control in Houston. The crew performed the Apollo light flash experiment, or ALFMED, to investigate "light flashes" that were seen by Apollo lunar astronauts when the spacecraft was dark, regardless of whether their eyes were open. This was thought to be caused by the penetration of the eye by cosmic ray particles. During the second half of the day, Young and Duke again entered the Lunar Module to power it up and check its systems, and perform housekeeping tasks in preparation for the lunar landing. The systems were found to be functioning as expected. Following this, the crew donned their space suits and rehearsed procedures that would be used on landing day. Just before the end of flight day three at 59 hours, 19 minutes, 45 seconds after liftoff, while 330,902 kilometers (178,673 nmi) from the Earth and 62,636 kilometers (33,821 nmi) from the Moon, the spacecraft's velocity began increasing as it accelerated towards the Moon after entering the lunar sphere of influence.

After waking up on flight day four, the crew began preparations for the LOI maneuver that would brake them into orbit. At an altitude of 20,635 kilometers (11,142 nmi) the scientific instrument module (SIM) bay cover was jettisoned. At just over 74 hours into the mission, the spacecraft passed behind the Moon, temporarily losing contact with Mission Control. While over the far side, the SPS burned for 6 minutes and 15 seconds, braking the spacecraft into an orbit with a low point (pericynthion) of 58.3 and a high point (apocynthion) of 170.4 nautical miles (108.0 and 315.6 km, respectively). After entering lunar orbit, the crew began preparations for the Descent Orbit Insertion (DOI) maneuver to further modify the spacecraft's orbital trajectory. The maneuver decreased the craft's pericynthion to 19.8 kilometers (10.7 nmi). The remainder of flight day four was spent making observations and preparing for activation of the Lunar Module, undocking, and landing the following day.

=== Lunar surface ===
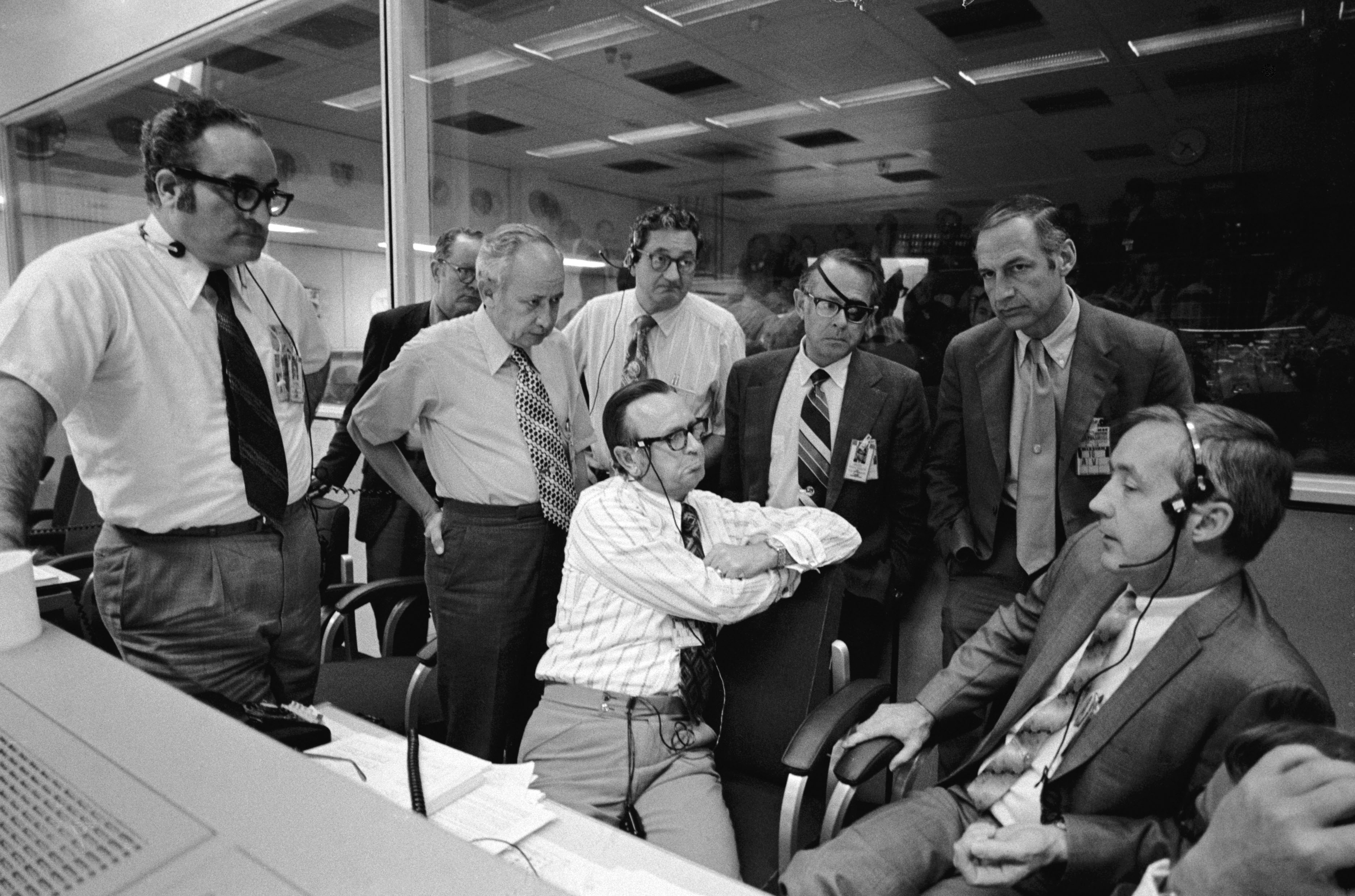
NASA officials conferring on whether to allow the Apollo 16 landing, April 20, 1972

The crew continued preparing for Lunar Module activation and undocking shortly after waking up to begin flight day five. The boom that extended the mass spectrometer in the SIM bay was stuck, semi-deployed. It was decided that Young and Duke would visually inspect the boom after undocking the LM from the CSM. They entered the LM for activation and checkout of the spacecraft's systems. Despite entering the LM 40 minutes ahead of schedule, they completed preparations only 10 minutes early due to numerous delays in the process. With the preparations finished, they undocked 96 hours, 13 minutes, 31 seconds into the mission.

For the rest of the two crafts' passes over the near side of the Moon, Mattingly prepared to shift Casper to a higher, near-circular orbit, while Young and Duke prepared Orion for the descent to the lunar surface. At this point, during tests of the CSM's steerable rocket engine in preparation for the burn to modify the craft's orbit, Mattingly detected oscillations in the SPS engine's backup gimbal system. According to mission rules, under such circumstances, Orion was to re-dock with Casper, in case Mission Control decided to abort the landing and use the Lunar Module's engines for the return trip to Earth. Instead, the two craft kept station, maintaining positions close to each other. After several hours of analysis, mission controllers determined that the malfunction could be worked around, and Young and Duke could proceed with the landing.

Powered descent to the lunar surface began about six hours behind schedule. Because of the delay, Young and Duke began their descent to the surface at an altitude higher than that of any previous mission, at 20.1 kilometers (10.9 nmi). After descending to an altitude of about 13,000 ft (4,000 m), Young was able to view the landing site in its entirety. Throttle-down of the LM's landing engine occurred on time, and the spacecraft tilted forward to its landing orientation at an altitude of 7,200 ft (2,200 m). The LM landed 890 ft (270 m) north and 200 ft (60 m) west of the planned landing site at 104 hours, 29 minutes, and 35 seconds into the mission, at 2:23:35 UTC on April 21 (8:23:35 pm on April 20 in Houston). The availability of the Lunar Roving Vehicle rendered their distance from the targeted point trivial.

After landing, Young and Duke began powering down some of the LM's systems to conserve battery power. Upon completing their initial procedures, the pair configured Orion for their three-day stay on the lunar surface, removed their space suits and took initial geological observations of the immediate landing site. They then settled down for their first meal on the surface. After eating, they configured the cabin for sleep. The landing delay caused by the malfunction in the CSM's main engine necessitated significant modifications to the mission schedule. Apollo 16 would spend one less day in lunar orbit after surface exploration had been completed to afford the crew ample margins in the event of further problems. In order to improve Young's and Duke's sleep schedule, the third and final moonwalk of the mission was trimmed from seven hours to five.

==== First moonwalk ====
After waking up on April 21, Young and Duke ate breakfast and began preparations for the first extravehicular activity (EVA), or moonwalk. After the pair donned and pressurized their space suits and depressurized the Lunar Module cabin, Young climbed out onto the "porch" of the LM, a small platform above the ladder. Duke handed Young a jettison bag full of trash to dispose of on the surface. Young then lowered the equipment transfer bag (ETB), containing equipment for use during the EVA, to the surface. Young descended the ladder and, upon setting foot on the lunar surface, became the ninth human to walk on the Moon. Upon stepping onto the surface, Young expressed his sentiments about being there: "There you are: Mysterious and unknown Descartes. Highland plains. Apollo 16 is gonna change your image. I'm sure glad they got ol' Brer Rabbit, here, back in the briar patch where he belongs." Duke soon descended the ladder and joined Young on the surface, becoming the tenth person to walk on the Moon. Duke was then aged 36; no younger human has ever walked on the lunar surface. Duke expressed his excitement, stating to CAPCOM Anthony England: "Fantastic! Oh, that first foot on the lunar surface is super, Tony!" The pair's first task of the moonwalk was to offload the Lunar Roving Vehicle, the Far Ultraviolet Camera/Spectrograph, and other equipment. This was done without problems. On first driving the lunar rover, Young discovered that the rear steering was not working. He alerted Mission Control to the problem before setting up the television camera, after which Duke erected the United States flag. During lunar surface operations, Commander Young always drove the rover, while Lunar Module Pilot Duke assisted with navigation; this was a division of responsibilities used consistently throughout Apollo's J missions.

Young driving the LRV during the "Grand Prix"

The day's next task was to deploy the ALSEP; while they were parking the lunar rover, on which the TV camera was mounted, to observe the deployment, the rear steering began functioning. After ALSEP deployment, they collected samples in the vicinity. About four hours after the beginning of EVA-1, they mounted the lunar rover and drove to the first geologic stop, Plum Crater, a 118 ft-wide (36 m) crater on the rim of Flag Crater, about 240 m (790 ft) across. There, at a distance of 1.4 km (0.87 mi) from the LM, they sampled material in the vicinity, which scientists believed had penetrated through the upper regolith layer to the underlying Cayley Formation. It was there that Duke retrieved, at the request of Mission Control, the largest rock returned by an Apollo mission, a breccia nicknamed Big Muley after mission geology principal investigator William R. Muehlberger. The next stop of the day was Buster Crater, a small crater located north of the larger Spook Crater, about 1.6 km (0.99 mi) from the LM. There, Duke took pictures of Stone Mountain and South Ray Crater, while Young deployed the LPM. By this point, scientists were beginning to reconsider their pre-mission hypothesis that Descartes had been the setting of ancient volcanic activity, as the two astronauts had yet to find any volcanic material. Following their stop at Buster, Young did a "Grand Prix" demonstration drive of the lunar rover, which Duke filmed with a 16 mm movie camera. This had been attempted on Apollo 15, but the camera had malfunctioned. After completing more tasks at the ALSEP, they returned to the LM to close out the moonwalk. They reentered the LM 7 hours, 6 minutes, and 56 seconds after the start of the EVA. Once inside, they pressurized the LM cabin, went through a half-hour debriefing with scientists in Mission Control, and configured the cabin for the sleep period.

==== Second moonwalk ====
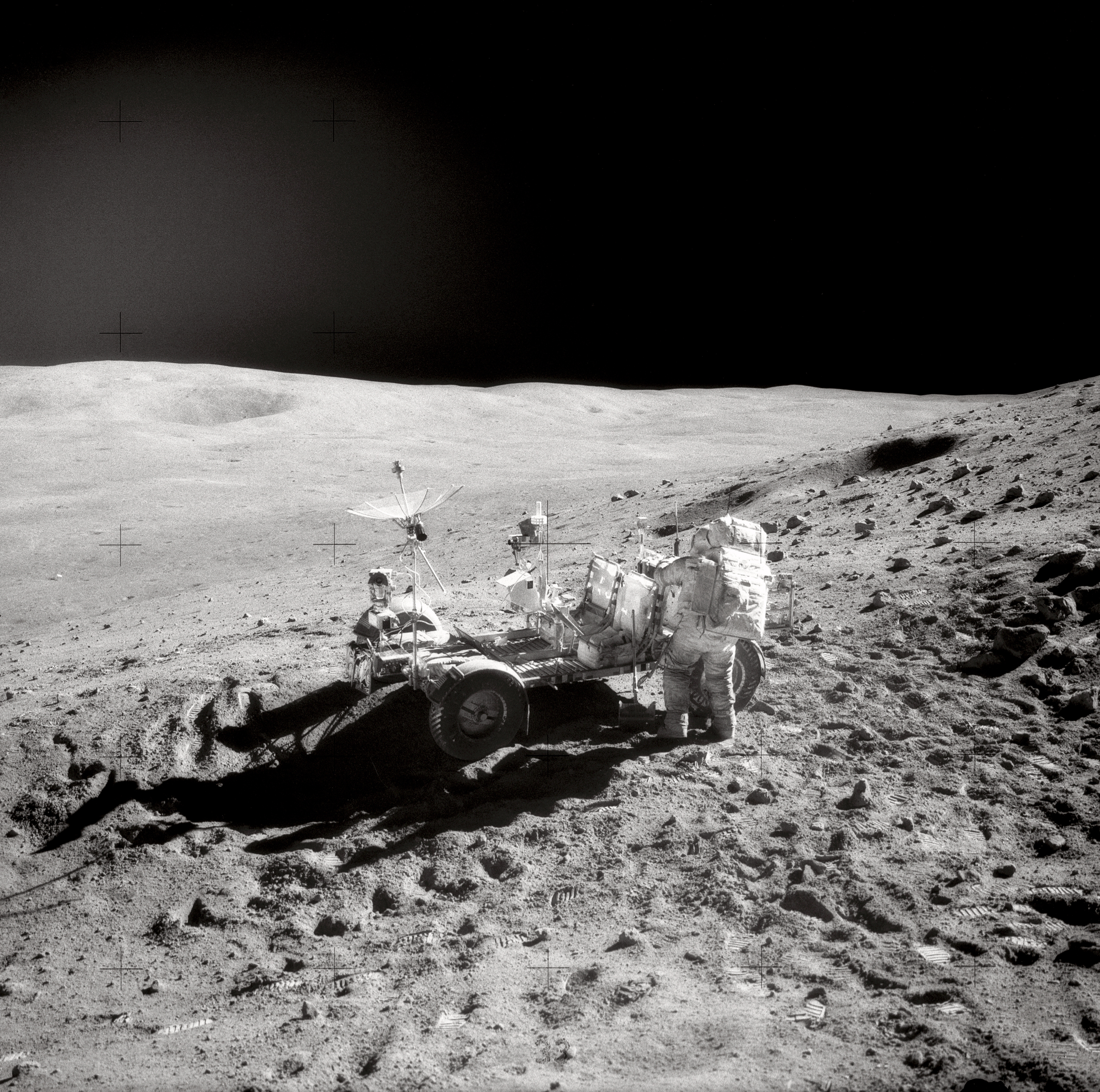
The view from the side of Stone Mountain, which Duke described as "spectacular"

Waking up three and a half minutes earlier than planned, they discussed the day's timeline of events with Houston. The second lunar excursion's primary objective was to visit Stone Mountain to climb up the slope of about 20 degrees to reach a cluster of five craters known as "Cinco craters". They drove there in the LRV, traveling 3.8 km (2.4 mi) from the LM. At 152 m (499 ft) above the valley floor, the pair were at the highest elevation above the LM of any Apollo mission. They marveled at the view (including South Ray) from the side of Stone Mountain, which Duke described as "spectacular", then gathered samples in the vicinity. After spending 54 minutes on the slope, they climbed aboard the lunar rover en route to the day's second stop, dubbed Station 5, a crater 20 m (66 ft) across. There, they hoped to find Descartes material that had not been contaminated by ejecta from South Ray Crater, a large crater south of the landing site. The samples they collected there, despite still uncertain origin, are according to geologist Wilhelms, "a reasonable bet to be Descartes".

The next stop, Station 6, was a 10 m-wide (33 ft) blocky crater, where the astronauts believed they could sample the Cayley Formation as evidenced by the firmer soil found there. Bypassing station seven to save time, they arrived at Station 8 on the lower flank of Stone Mountain, where they sampled material on a ray from South Ray crater for about an hour. There, they collected black and white breccias and smaller, crystalline rocks rich in plagioclase. At Station 9, an area known as the "Vacant Lot", which was believed to be free of ejecta from South Ray, they spent about 40 minutes gathering samples. Twenty-five minutes after departing the Vacant Lot, they arrived at the final stop of the day, halfway between the ALSEP site and the LM. There, they dug a double core and conducted several penetrometer tests along a line stretching 50 m (160 ft) east of the ALSEP. At the request of Young and Duke, the moonwalk was extended by ten minutes. After returning to the LM to wrap up the second lunar excursion, they climbed back inside the landing craft's cabin, sealing and pressurizing the interior after 7 hours, 23 minutes, and 26 seconds of EVA time, breaking a record that had been set on Apollo 15. After eating a meal and proceeding with a debriefing on the day's activities with Mission Control, they reconfigured the LM cabin and prepared for the sleep period.

==== Third moonwalk ====
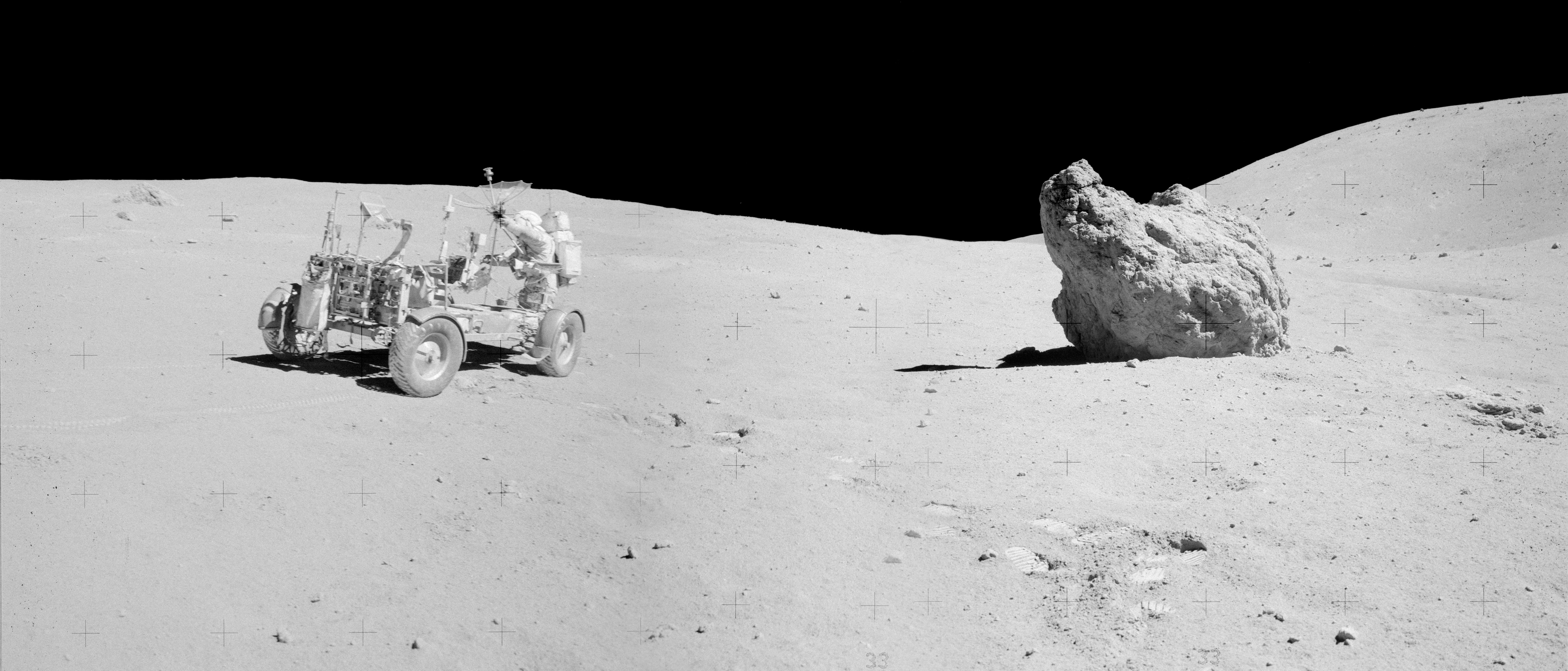
John Young adjusting the LRV's antenna near Shadow Rock

Flight day seven was their third and final day on the lunar surface, returning to orbit to rejoin Mattingly in the CSM following the day's moonwalk. During the third and final lunar excursion, they were to explore North Ray crater, the largest of any of the craters any Apollo expedition had visited. After exiting Orion, the pair drove to North Ray crater. The drive was smoother than that of the previous day, as the craters were shallower and boulders were less abundant north of the immediate landing site. After passing Palmetto crater, boulders gradually became larger and more abundant as they approached North Ray in the lunar rover. Upon arriving at the rim of North Ray crater, they were 4.4 km (2.7 mi) away from the LM. After their arrival, the duo took photographs of the 1 km (0.62 mi) wide and 230 m (750 ft) deep crater. They visited a large boulder, taller than a four-story building, which became known as 'House Rock'. Samples obtained from this boulder delivered the final blow to the pre-mission volcanic hypothesis, proving it incorrect. House Rock had numerous bullet hole-like marks where micrometeoroids from space had impacted the rock.

About 1 hour and 22 minutes after arriving at the North Ray crater, they departed for Station 13, a large boulder field about 0.5 km (0.31 mi) from North Ray. On the way, they set a lunar speed record, traveling at an estimated 17.1 kilometers per hour (10.6 mph) downhill. They arrived at a 3 m (9.8 ft) high boulder, which they called "Shadow Rock". Here, they sampled permanently shadowed soil. During this time, Mattingly was preparing the CSM in anticipation of their return approximately six hours later. After three hours and six minutes, they returned to the LM, where they completed several experiments and unloaded the rover. A short distance from the LM, Duke placed a photograph of his family and an Air Force commemorative medallion on the surface. Young drove the rover to a point about 90 m (300 ft) east of the LM, known as the 'VIP site,' so its television camera, controlled remotely by Mission Control, could observe Apollo 16's liftoff from the Moon. They then reentered the LM after a 5-hour and 40-minute final excursion. After pressurizing the LM cabin, the crew began preparing to return to lunar orbit.

=== Solo activities ===
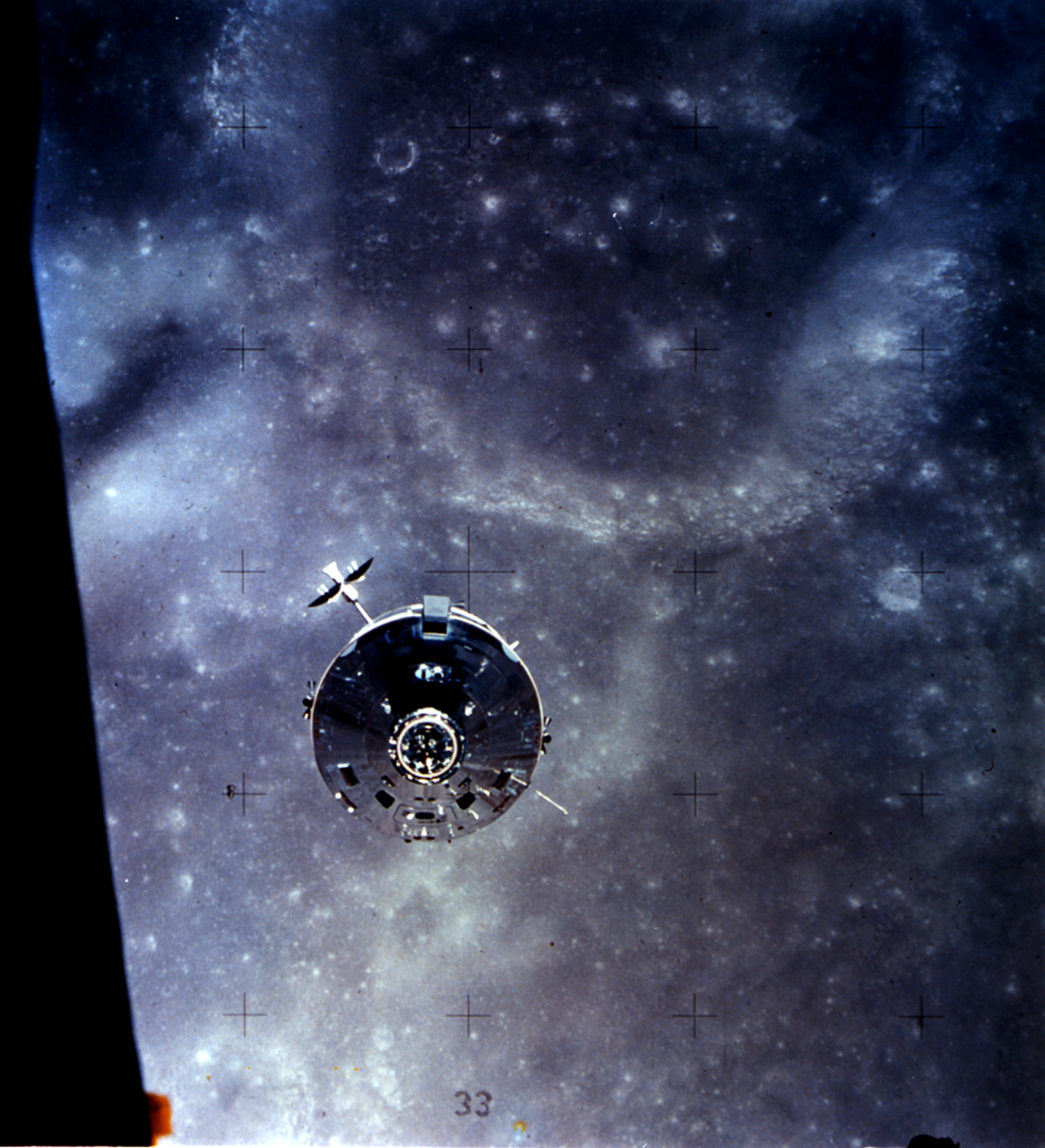
Casper above the Moon

After Orion was cleared for the landing attempt, Casper maneuvered away, and Mattingly performed a burn that took his spacecraft to an orbit of 98.3 by 125.6 kilometers; 61.1 by 78.0 miles (53.1 by 67.8 nmi) in preparation for his scientific work. The SM carried a suite of scientific instruments in its SIM bay, similar to those carried on Apollo 15. Mattingly had compiled a busy schedule operating the various SIM bay instruments, one that became even busier once Houston decided to bring Apollo 16 home a day early, as the flight directors sought to make up for lost time.

His work was hampered by various malfunctions: when the Panoramic Camera was turned on, it appeared to take so much power from one of the CSM's electrical systems, that it initiated the spacecraft Master Alarm. It was immediately shut off, though later analysis indicated that the drain might have been from the spacecraft's heaters, which came on at the same time. Its work was also hampered by the delay in the beginning of Casper's orbital scientific work and the early return to Earth, and by a malfunction resulting in the overexposure of many of the photographs. Nevertheless, it was able to take a photograph of the Descartes area in which Orion is visible. The Mass Spectrometer boom did not fully retract following its initial extension, as had happened on Apollo 15, though it retracted far enough to allow the SPS engine to be fired safely when Casper maneuvered away from Orion before the LM began its Moon landing attempt. Although the Mass Spectrometer was able to operate effectively, it stuck near its fully deployed position prior to the burn that preceded rendezvous, and had to be jettisoned. Scientists had hoped to supplement the lunar data gained with more on the trans-Earth coast, but Apollo 15 data could be used instead. The Mapping Camera also did not function perfectly; later analysis found it to have problems with its glare shield. The changes to the flight plan meant that some areas of the lunar surface that were supposed to be photographed could not be; also, a number of images were overexposed. The Laser Altimeter, designed to accurately measure the spacecraft altitude, slowly lost accuracy due to reduced power, and finally failed just before it was due to be used for the last time.

=== Return to Earth ===
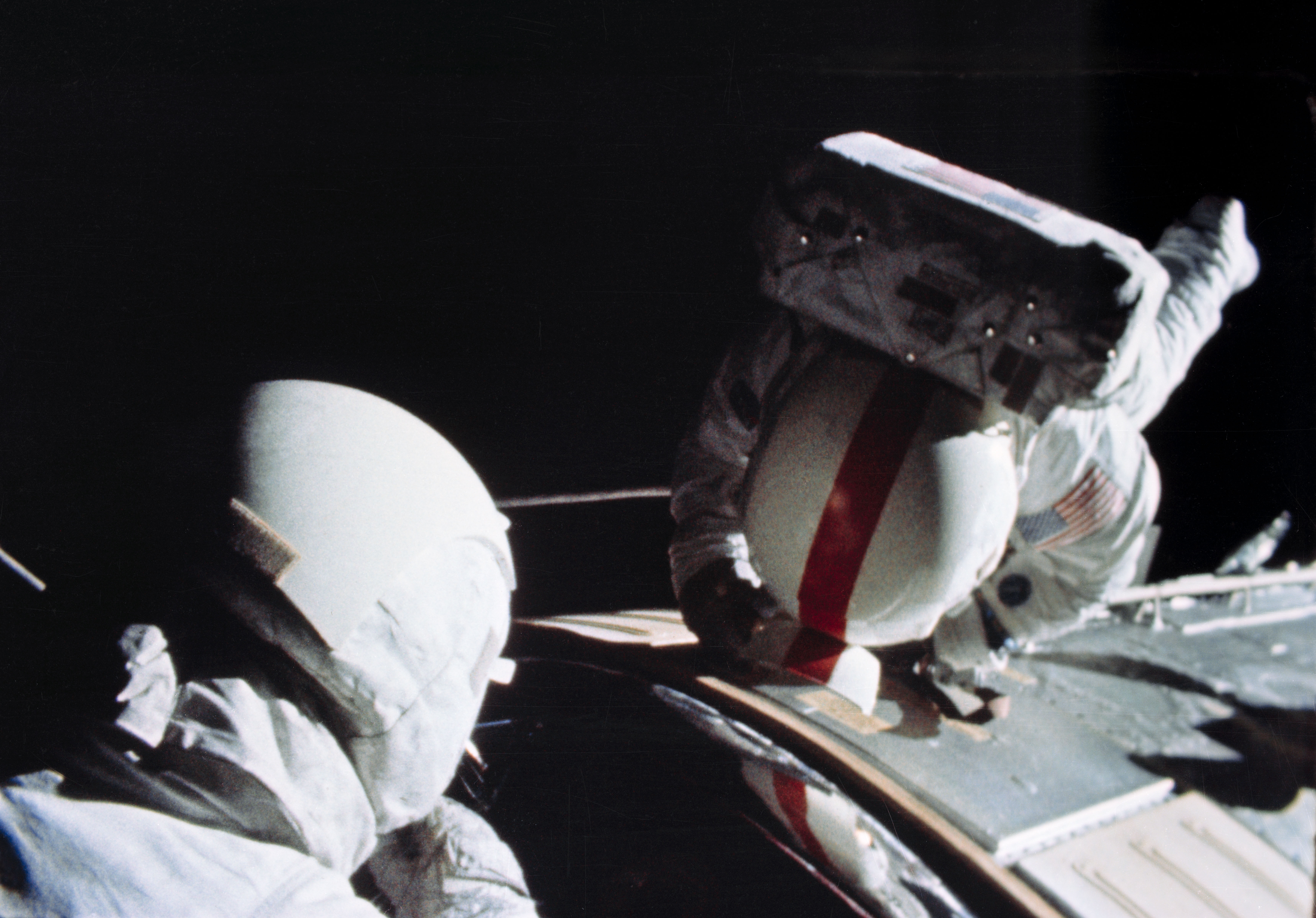
Ken Mattingly performing his deep-space EVA, retrieving film cassettes from the CSM's exterior

Eight minutes before the planned departure from the lunar surface, CAPCOM James Irwin notified Young and Duke from Mission Control that they were go for liftoff. Two minutes before launch, they activated the "Master Arm" switch and then the "Abort Stage" button, causing small explosive charges to sever the ascent stage from the descent stage, with cables connecting the two severed by a guillotine-like mechanism. At the pre-programmed moment, there was liftoff and the ascent stage blasted away from the Moon, as the camera aboard the LRV followed the first moments of the flight. Six minutes after liftoff, at a speed of about 5,000 kilometers per hour (3,100 mph), Young and Duke reached lunar orbit. Young and Duke rendezvoused and re-docked with Mattingly in the CSM. To minimize the transfer of lunar dust from the LM cabin into the CSM, Young and Duke cleaned the cabin before opening the hatch separating the two spacecraft. After opening the hatch and reuniting with Mattingly, the crew transferred the samples Young and Duke had collected on the surface into the CSM for transfer to Earth. After transfers were completed, the crew would sleep before jettisoning the empty Lunar Module ascent stage the next day, when it was to be crashed intentionally into the lunar surface in order to calibrate the seismometer Young and Duke had left on the surface.

The next day, after final checks were completed, the expended LM ascent stage was jettisoned. Likely because of a failure by the crew to activate a certain switch in the LM before sealing it off, it tumbled after separation. NASA could not control it, and it did not execute the rocket burn necessary for the craft's intentional de-orbit. The ascent stage eventually crashed into the lunar surface nearly a year after the mission. The crew's next task, after jettisoning the Lunar Module ascent stage, was to release a subsatellite into lunar orbit from the CSM's scientific instrument bay. The burn to alter the CSM's orbit to that desired for the subsatellite had been cancelled; as a result, the subsatellite lasted just over a month in orbit, far less than its anticipated one year. Just under five hours after the subsatellite release, on the CSM's 65th orbit around the Moon, its service propulsion system main engine was reignited to propel the craft on a trajectory that would return it to Earth. The SPS engine performed the burn flawlessly despite the malfunction that had delayed their landing several days previously.

During the return to Earth, Mattingly performed an 83-minute EVA to retrieve film cassettes from the cameras in the SIM bay, with assistance from Duke who remained at the command module's hatch. At approximately 173,000 nautical miles (199,000 mi; 320,000 km) from Earth, it was the second "deep space" EVA in history, performed at great distance from any planetary body. As of 2026, it remains one of only three such EVAs, all performed during Apollo's J-missions under similar circumstances. During the EVA, Mattingly set up a biological experiment, the Microbial Ecology Evaluation Device (MEED), an experiment unique to Apollo 16, to evaluate the response of microbes to the space environment. The crew carried out various housekeeping and maintenance tasks aboard the spacecraft and ate a meal before concluding the day.

The penultimate day of the flight was largely spent performing experiments, aside from a twenty-minute press conference during the second half of the day. During the press conference, the astronauts answered questions pertaining to several technical and non-technical aspects of the mission prepared and listed by priority at the Manned Spacecraft Center in Houston by journalists covering the flight. In addition to numerous housekeeping tasks, the astronauts prepared the spacecraft for its atmospheric reentry the next day. At the end of the crew's final full day in space, the spacecraft was approximately 143,000 kilometers (77,000 nmi) from Earth and closing at a rate of about 2.1 kilometers per second (7,000 ft/s).

When the wake-up call was issued to the crew for their final day in space by CAPCOM England, the CSM was about 45,000 nautical miles (83,000 km) from Earth, traveling just over 2.7 km/s (9,000 ft/s). Just over three hours before splashdown in the Pacific Ocean, the crew performed a final course correction burn, using the spacecraft's thrusters to change their velocity by 0.43 m/s (1.4 ft/s). Approximately ten minutes before reentry into Earth's atmosphere, the cone-shaped command module containing the three crewmembers separated from the service module, which would burn up during reentry. At 265 hours and 37 minutes into the mission, at a velocity of about 11 km/s (36,000 ft/s), Apollo 16 began atmospheric reentry. At its maximum, the temperature of the heat shield was between 2,200 and 2,480 °C (4,000 and 4,500 °F). After parachute deployment and less than 14 minutes after reentry began, the command module splashed down in the Pacific Ocean 350 kilometers (189 nmi) southeast of the island of Kiritimati 265 hours, 51 minutes, 5 seconds after liftoff. The spacecraft and its crew was retrieved by the aircraft carrier USS Ticonderoga. The astronauts were safely aboard the Ticonderoga 37 minutes after splashdown.

== Scientific results and aftermath ==
Scientific analysis of the rocks brought back to Earth confirmed that the Cayley Formation was not volcanic in nature. There was less certainty regarding the Descartes Formation, as it was not clear which if any of the rocks came from there. There was no evidence that showed that Stone Mountain was volcanic. One reason why Descartes had been selected was that it was visually different from previous Apollo landing sites, but rocks from there proved to be closely related to those from the Fra Mauro Formation, Apollo 14's landing site. Geologists realized that they had been so certain that Cayley was volcanic, they had not been open to dissenting views, and that they had been over-reliant on analogues from Earth, a flawed model because the Moon does not share much of the Earth's geologic history. They concluded that there are few if any volcanic mountains on the Moon. These conclusions were informed by observations from Mattingly, the first CMP to use binoculars in his observations, who had seen that from the perspective of lunar orbit, there was nothing distinctive about the Descartes Formation—it fit right in with the Mare Imbrium structure. Other results gained from Apollo 16 included the discovery of two new auroral belts around Earth.

After the mission, Young and Duke served as backups for Apollo 17, and Duke retired from NASA in December 1975. Young and Mattingly both flew the Space Shuttle: Young, who served as Chief Astronaut from 1974 to 1987, commanded the first Space Shuttle mission, STS-1 in 1981, as well as STS-9 in 1983, on the latter mission becoming the first person to journey into space six times. He retired from NASA in 2004. Mattingly also twice commanded Shuttle missions, STS-4 (1982) and STS-51-C (1985), before retiring from NASA in 1985.

== Locations of spacecraft and other equipment ==
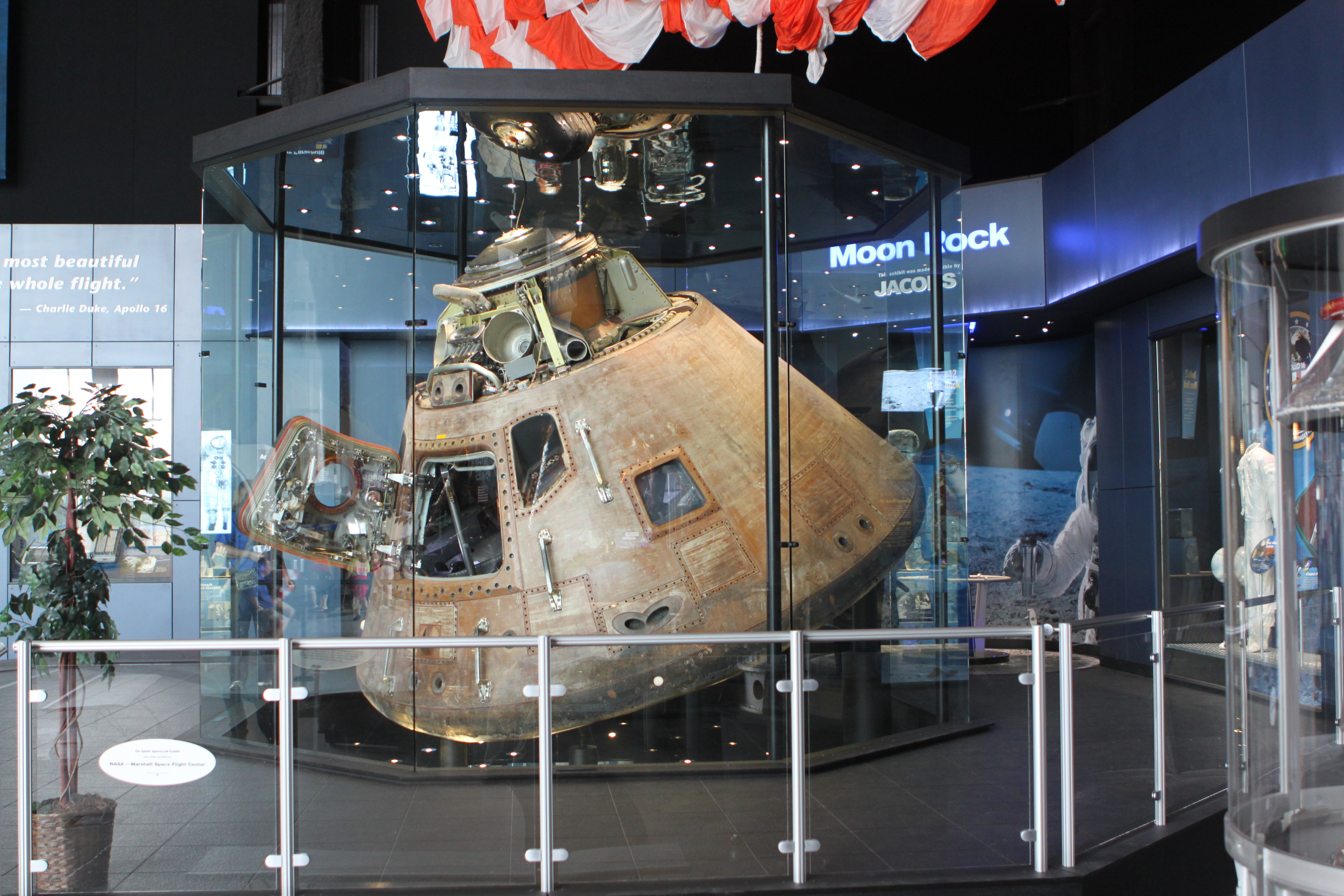
Command module Casper at the U.S. Space & Rocket Center in Huntsville, Alabama

The Ticonderoga delivered the Apollo 16 command module to the North Island Naval Air Station, near San Diego, California, on Friday, May 5, 1972. On Monday, May 8, ground service equipment being used to empty the residual toxic reaction control system fuel in the command module tanks exploded in a Naval Air Station hangar. Forty-six people were sent to the hospital for 24 to 48 hours' observation, most suffering from inhalation of toxic fumes. Most seriously injured was a technician who suffered a fractured kneecap when a cart overturned on him. A hole was blown in the hangar roof 250 feet above; about 40 windows in the hangar were shattered. The command module suffered a three-inch gash in one panel.

The Apollo 16 command module Casper is on display at the U.S. Space & Rocket Center in Huntsville, Alabama, following a transfer of ownership from NASA to the Smithsonian in November 1973. The Lunar Module ascent stage separated from the CSM on April 24, 1972, but NASA lost control of it. It orbited the Moon for about a year. Its impact site remains unknown, though research published in 2023 suggests an impact date of May 29, 1972 (the same as for the subsatellite) and an impact location of 9.99° N, 104.26° E. The S-IVB was deliberately crashed into the Moon. However, due to a communication failure before impact the exact location was unknown until January 2016, when it was discovered within Mare Insularum by the Lunar Reconnaissance Orbiter, approximately 260 km (160 mi) southwest of Copernicus Crater.

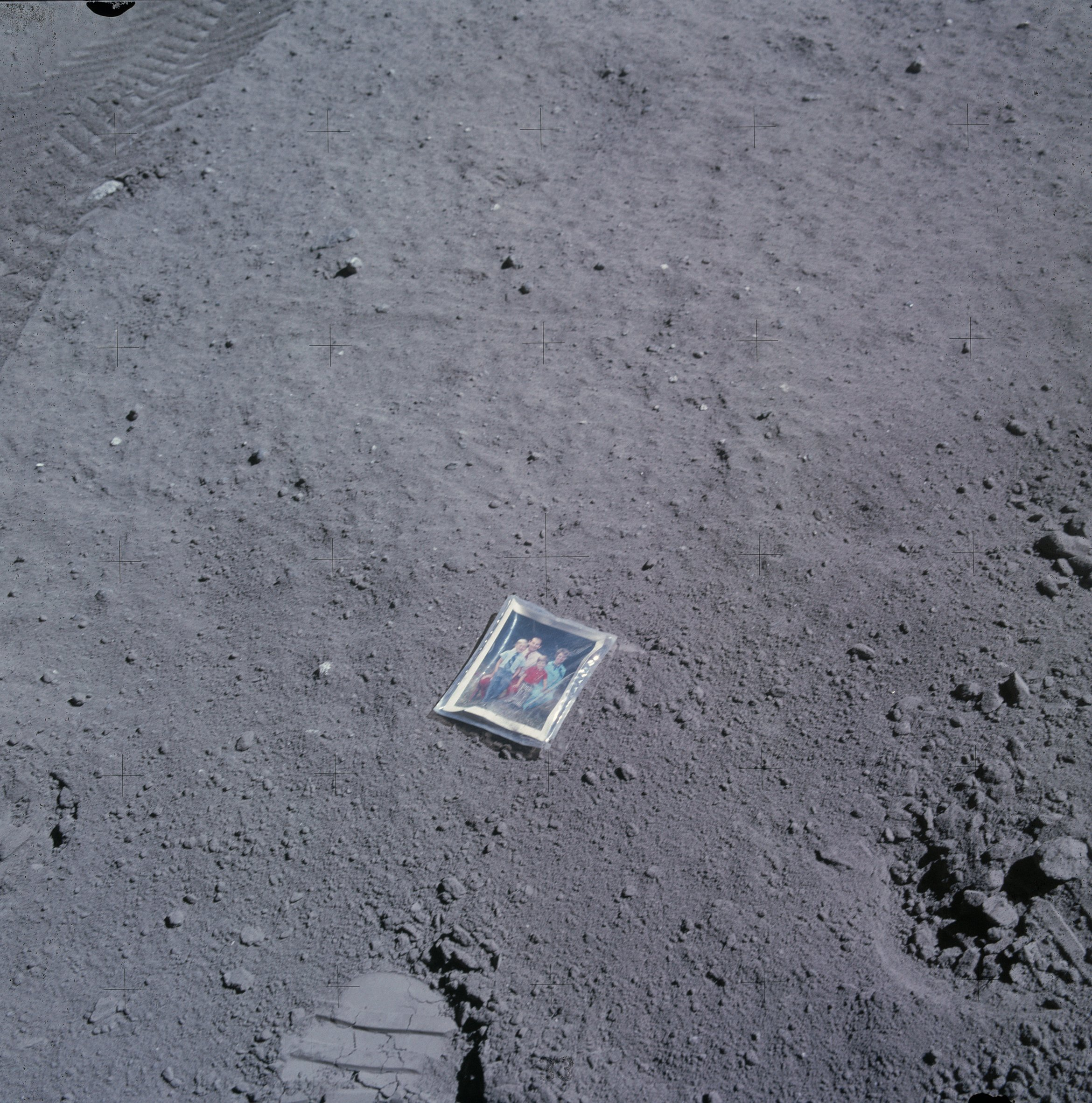
Duke left a photo of his family on the Moon.

Duke left two items on the Moon, both of which he photographed while there. One is a plastic-encased photo portrait of his family. The reverse of the photo is signed by Duke's family and bears this message: "This is the family of Astronaut Duke from Planet Earth. Landed on the Moon, April 1972." The other item was a commemorative medal issued by the United States Air Force, which was celebrating its 25th anniversary in 1972. He took two medals, leaving one on the Moon and donating the other to the National Museum of the United States Air Force at Wright-Patterson Air Force Base in Ohio.

In 2006, shortly after Hurricane Ernesto affected Bath, North Carolina, eleven-year-old Kevin Schanze discovered a piece of metal debris on the ground near his beach home. Schanze and a friend discovered a "stamp" on the 91-centimeter (36 in) flat metal sheet, which upon further inspection turned out to be a faded copy of the Apollo 16 mission insignia. NASA later confirmed the object to be a piece of the first stage of the Saturn V that had launched Apollo 16 into space. In July 2011, after returning the piece of debris at NASA's request, Schanze and his family were given an all-access tour of the Kennedy Space Center and VIP seating for the launch of STS-135, the final mission of the Space Shuttle program.

== See also ==
- List of artificial objects on the Moon
- List of missions to the Moon
- List of spacewalks and moonwalks 1965–1999
