= Apollo 12 Passive Seismic Experiment =

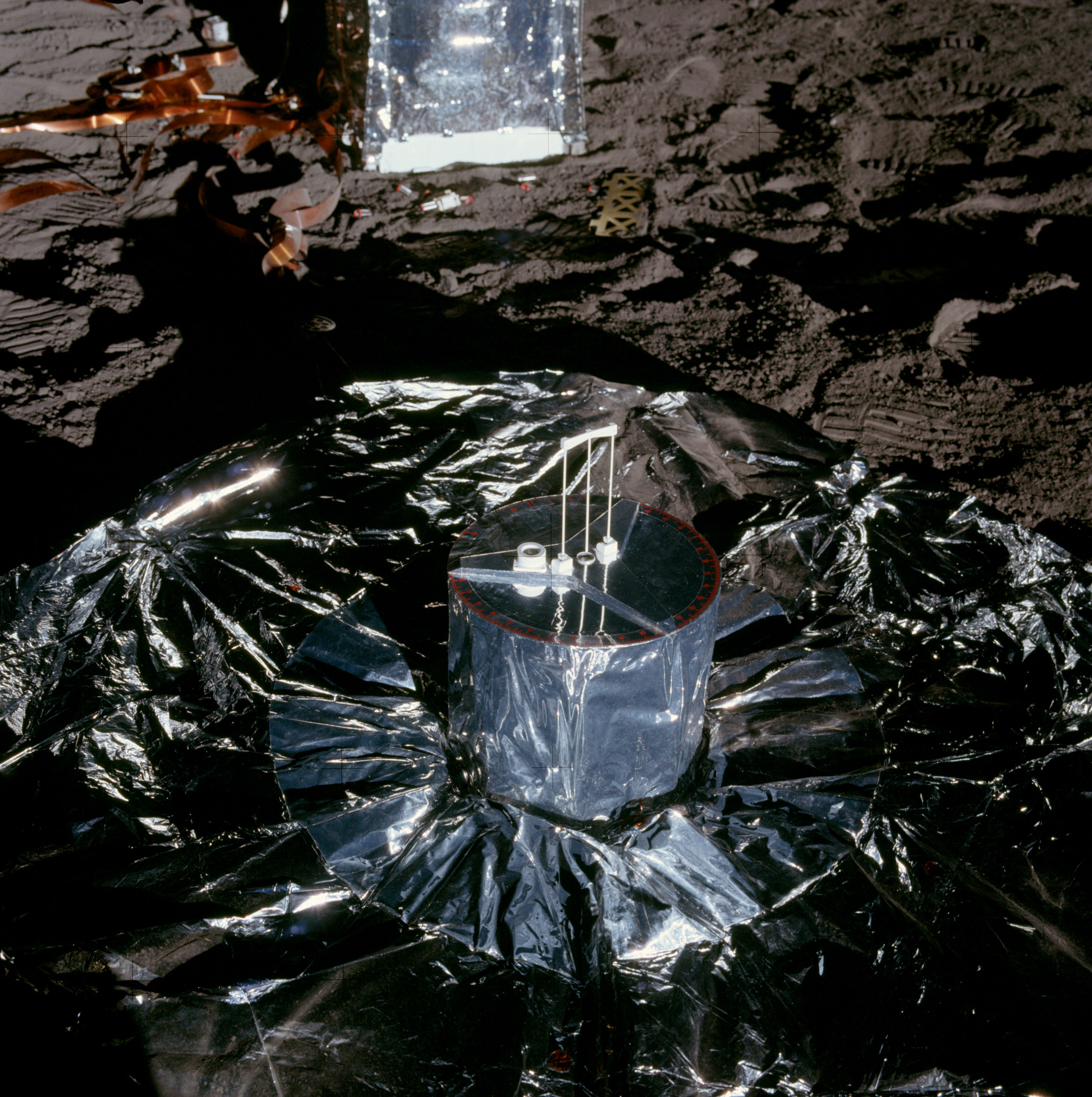
- PSE on the Moon's surface
- Acronym: PSE
- Uses: To detect vibrations and tilting of the lunar surface and measure changes in gravity

The Apollo 12 Passive Seismic Experiment (PSE) was placed on the lunar surface by the Apollo 12 mission as part of the Apollo Lunar Surface Experiments Package (ALSEP). The PSE was designed to detect vibrations and tilting of the lunar surface and measure changes in gravity at the instrument location. The vibrations are due to internal seismic sources (moonquakes) and external (meteoroids and impacts from the spent S-IVB and LM ascent stages). The primary objective of the experiment was to use these data to determine the internal structure, physical state, and tectonic activity of the Moon. The secondary objectives were to determine the number and mass of meteoroids that strike the Moon and record tidal deformations of the lunar surface.

== Specification ==
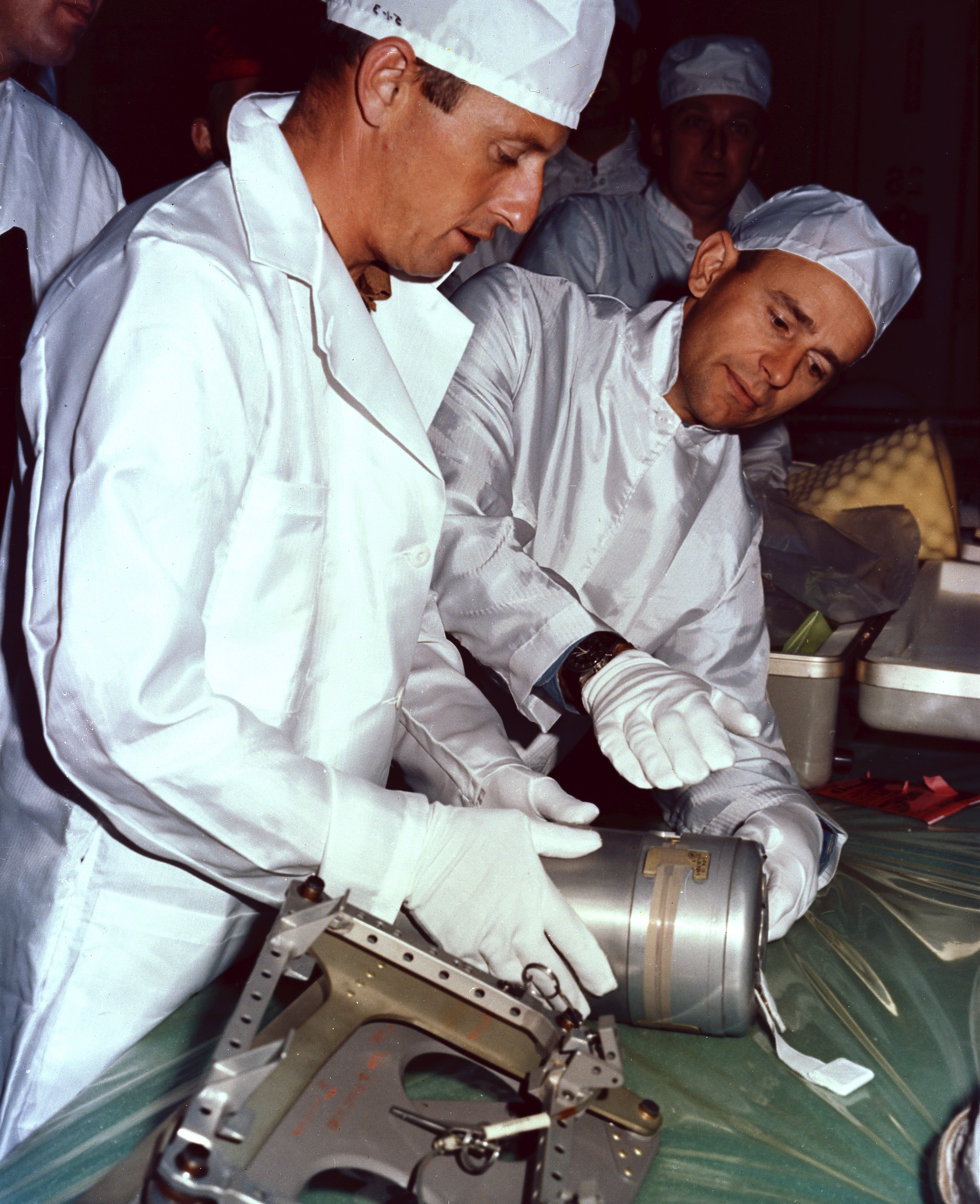
Apollo 12 astronauts Pete Conrad and Al Bean examining the Passive Seismometer prior to the flight

The PSE unit was constructed principally of beryllium and had a mass of 11.5 kg, including the electronics module and thermal insulation. It was housed in a drum-shaped enclosure 23 cm in diameter and 29 cm in height. The enclosure was rounded on the bottom and rested on a leveling stool. The PSE consisted of two main subsystems, a sensor unit and an electronics module. The sensor unit contained three matched long-period (LP) seismometers aligned orthogonally in a triaxial set to measure one vertical and two horizontal components of surface motion. The horizontal component seismometers were very sensitive to tilt and were leveled to high accuracy by means of a two-axis motor-driven gimbal operated by ground command. A third motor adjusted the vertical component seismometer in the vertical direction. A fourth, short-period (SP) seismometer with a resonant period of 1 second measured vertical motion at a peak sensitivity of 8 Hz and a response range from 0.05 to 20 Hz. A thermal shroud and 2.5-W heater for thermal control comprised the rest of the experiment package. The thermal shroud was aluminized mylar which covered the instrument and the ground surrounding the base out to about 75 cm radially. A gnomon and level sensor were mounted on the top center of the shroud. Total power drain varied from 4.3 to 7.4 W.

The seismometers consisted of an inertial mass on a sensor boom suspended by springs and hinges, a capacitor plate and a damping magnet. The LP seismometers could function in a flat-response mode and in a peaked response mode. In the flat response mode, the LP seismometers had a natural period of 15 s. In the peaked-response mode, they acted as underdamped pendulums with a natural period of 2.2 s. Sensitivity to ground motion peaked sharply at 0.45 Hz in peaked response mode with a useful frequency range of 0.004 to 2 Hz. Maximum sensitivity was enhanced by a factor of 5.6 in the peaked response mode, but sensitivity to low-frequency signals was reduced. All seismometers could detect ground motions as small as 0.3 nm. At tidal frequencies, gravitational acceleration was measured by monitoring the feedback current used to center the seismometer mass. The sensitivity of the instruments was 0.008 mgal. The lunar surface impacts of the spent S-IVB and LM ascent stages were used as external calibration sources for the seismometers. The known mass and velocity of these stages at surface impact and the lunar impact point coordinates enabled the computation of energy generated at impact and the point of energy application. (The calibration characteristics were determined by measuring seismometer response to these energy sources.)

== Deployment ==
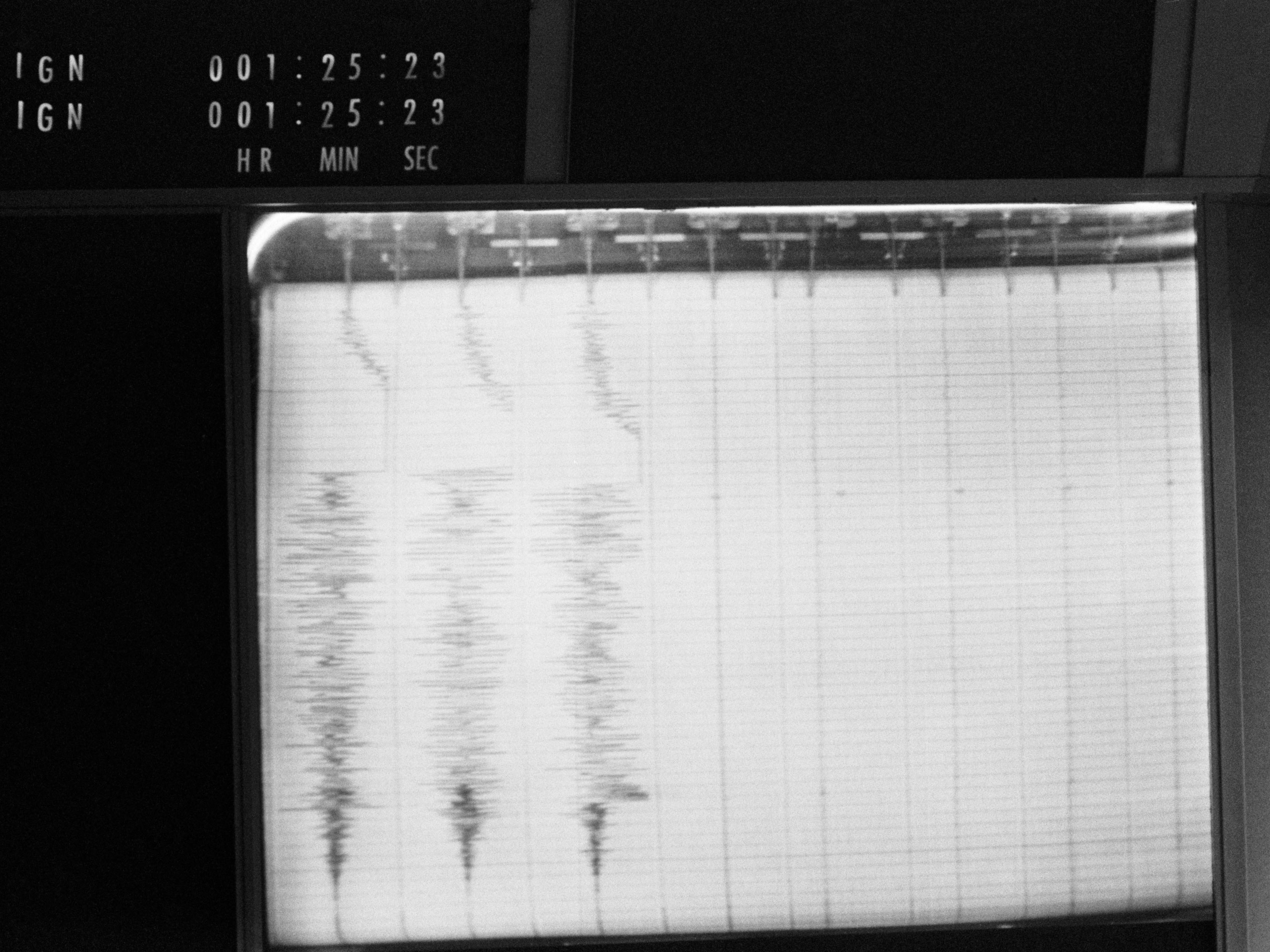
A recording of the Apollo 13 S-IVB's impact on the lunar surface as detected by the Apollo 12 Passive Seismic Experiment

The seismometers were deployed on 19 November 1969 and operated at reduced gain while the astronauts were on the lunar surface and turned to maximum sensitivity for most of the time after that. The ALSEP central station was located at 3.0094°S 23.4246°W. The passive seismic experiment was deployed 3 meters east of the central station. The SP seismometer displayed reduced sensitivity at low signal levels following deployment. Seismic disturbances were noted throughout the lunar day, but particularly near sunrise and sunset, these were believed to be due to expansion and contraction of the mylar shroud and/or the cable to the central station.

Once the astronauts had returned to the CSM, the LM ascent stage was released and collided with the Moon. The LM hit the lunar surface at 6,048 km/h and created an estimated 9 meter wide crater. The shock waves from the impact were a surprise to the scientists, with the Moon vibrating for over 55 minutes. The seismometers also recorded signals that were totally unlike any received before, starting with small waves that gained in size to a peak which persisted for a long time. It was reported that even after an hour the smallest reverberations had not yet stopped.

The Apollo 13 S-IVB with its Instrument Unit was guided to crash onto the lunar surface on April 14, 1970, providing a signal for the PSE.

Operation was normal with a few minor incidents over the years until the PSE was commanded to standby on 30 September 1977 as part of the ALSEP station shutdown.

== See also ==
- Lunar seismology
- List of artificial objects on the Moon
