= Brian O'Brien (space scientist) =

Australian space scientist (1934–2020)

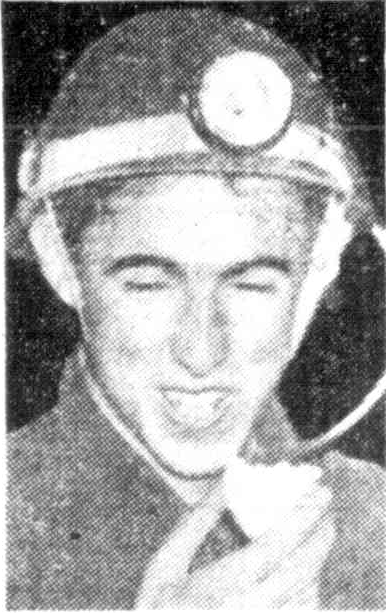
- O'Brien at 19 in caving gear
- Born: Brian John O'Brien; 27 February 1934; Sydney NSW
- Died: 7 August 2020 (aged 87)
- Education: Sydney University
- Known for: Lunar Dust Detector experiments on Apollo 11, 12, 14 and 15 Missions, Radiation (CPLEE) experiment on Apollo 11 Mission
- Spouse: Avril O'Brien
- Scientific career
- Workplaces: NASA

Brian John O'Brien AO FTSE (27 February 1934 – 7 August 2020) was an Australian physicist and space scientist. He is best known for his "research into lunar dust and the challenges it presents for exploration of the Moon." He "highlighted how hazardous it was for astronauts and their equipment." Five experiments designed by him were placed on the Moon by the Apollo 11 Mission. One measured radiation, the others were concerned with Moon dust.

O'Brien also designed the Charged Particle Lunar Environment Experiment (CPLEE), placed on the lunar surface by the Apollo 14 mission as part of the Apollo Lunar Surface Experiments Package (ALSEP).

After studying physics at Sydney University, O'Brien worked as a physicist in Antarctica. There he saw the aurora australis, which led to his space career.

He was a NASA principal investigator. For his radiation experiment, he was awarded the NASA Medal for Exceptional Scientific Achievement. He was the first Australian so awarded.

O'Brien was a professor of space science at Rice University, Houston, from 1963 to 1968, and adjunct professor of physics at the University of Western Australia from 2009 until 2020.

He later moved to Perth with his wife, Avril, and headed the Environmental Protection Authority of Western Australia.

O'Brien was elected a Fellow of the Australian Academy of Technological Sciences and Engineering (FTSE) in 1993.

He died on 7 August 2020, aged 86.

O'Brien was posthumously made an Officer of the Order of Australia (AO) in the 2021 Australia Day Honours.
