= Passive Seismic Experiment Package =

1969 American experiment on the Moon

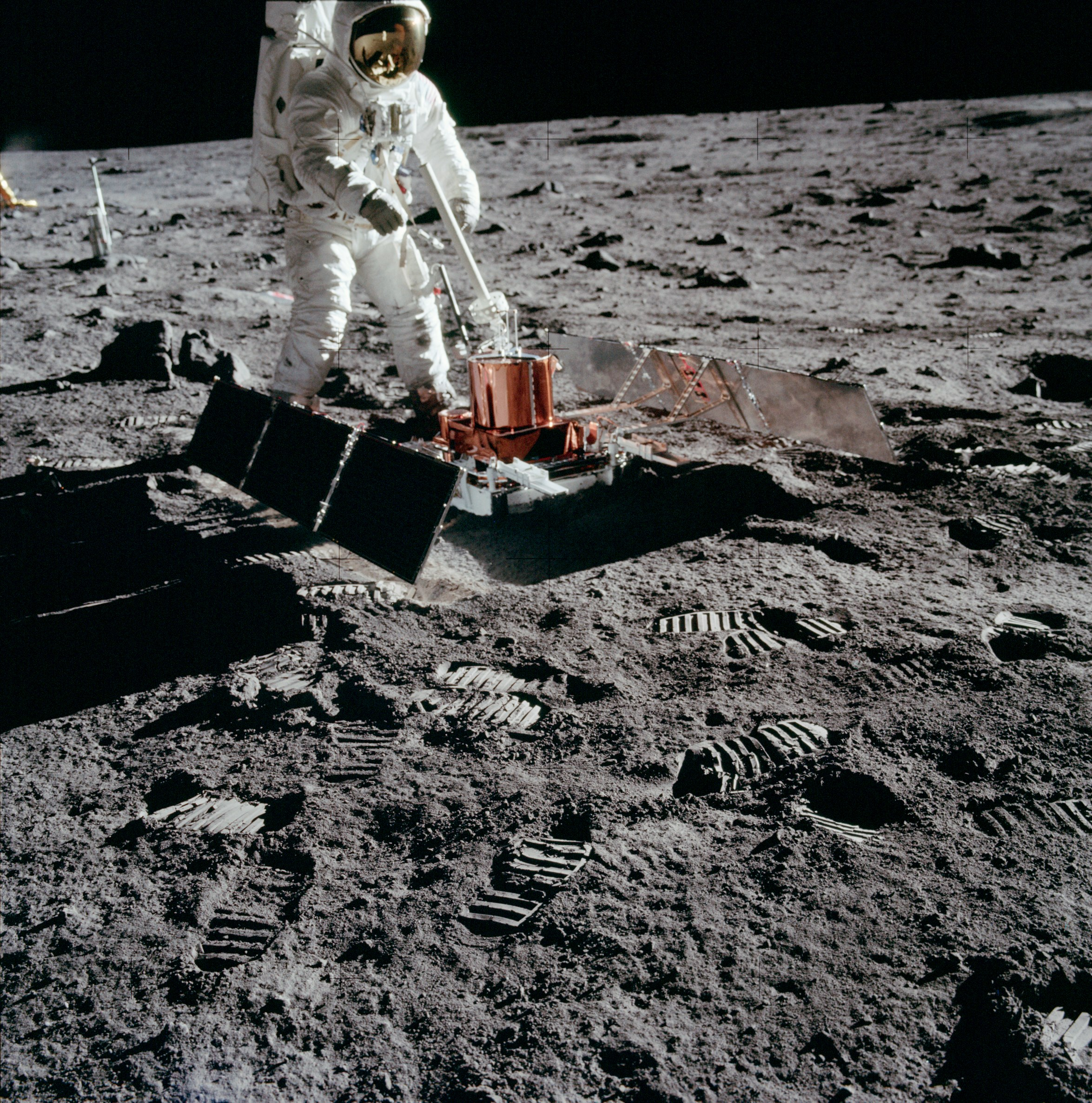
- The Passive Seismic Experiment Package on the Moon
- Acronym: PSEP
- Notable experiments: Apollo 11 mission
- Inventor: Dr. Gary Latham, Lamont-Doherty Geological Observatory; Dr. Maurice Ewing, Lamont-Doherty Geological Observatory; Dr. Frank Press, Massachusetts Institute of Technology; Dr. George Sutton, University of Hawaii
- Manufacturer: Lamont-Doherty Geological Observatory; Columbia University; California Institute of Technology Seismological Laboratory

The Passive Seismic Experiment Package (PSEP) was a scientific experiment deployed on the lunar surface by the astronauts of Apollo 11 as part of the Early Apollo Surface Experiments Package (EASEP). The experiment's goal was to determine the structure, tectonic activity, physical nature, and composition of the Moon. PSEP was the first seismometer to be deployed on a planetary body other than Earth.

== Background ==
The California Institute of Technology had been part of multiple prior attempts to measure the Moon's seismic activity, providing instruments on Ranger 3, Ranger 4 and Ranger 5. All three landers on these missions failed to reach their destination successfully. Separately, a research group at the Lamont–Doherty Geological Observatory had developed a seismometer to fly on landers that were part of the Surveyor program. Due to reduced payload capacities and NASA's decision to prioritize experiments that would provide transferable knowledge related to crewed landings on the Moon, the probes did not carry seismometers.

== Instrument ==
Power to this experiment was provided by EASEP via solar cell panels and operations of the experiment were limited to the lunar day. On later Apollo missions as part of Apollo Lunar Surface Experiments Package, power was provided to those packages' seismic experiments via a radioisotope thermoelectric generator.

The experiment's sensor system was made of two parts:

- three low-frequency seismometers in an orthogonal triaxial arrangement to capture horizontal and vertical movement.
- one single-axis high-frequency seismometer that only measured vertical motion.

== Deployment and operation ==
The PSEP was placed 16.8 meters (55 ft) from the Apollo 11 Lunar Module Eagle at Tranquility Base on July 21, 1969. A set of 15 different commands could be sent to the experiment package from mission control on Earth to direct the instrument's levelling and calibration motors.

The instrument temperature reached a maximum of 190 °F (88 °C), 50 °F (28 °C) greater than the expected maximum of 140 °F (60 °C). This higher than expected temperature resulted in minor effects such as intermittent transient signals on the low frequency seismometers, but did not significantly affect instrument performance. The low frequency seismometers drifted out of their operating range on the last two days and could not be recalibrated because the package could not receive commands.

The seismometers were particularly affected by the amount of seismic noise that emanated from the Lunar Module. This seismic noise was the result of venting, fluid circulation, and the Lunar Module's response to changes in temperature. Future missions would seek to deploy seismometers at the farthest possible distance from the Lunar Module.

== Measurements and science ==
The background seismic levels on the Moon were found to be very low, far lower than that measured by any known instrument on Earth at the time. While there are large thermal variations due to the diurnal cycle, this does not result in a high background noise. A different hypothesis suggested that the Moon would have a continuous level of meteoroid impacts that would result in a high background noise, but this was similarly disproven. The most significant hypothesis these observations led to was the knowledge that the Moon was absent of any of the significant tectonic processes observed in the Earth's crust.

Seven types of signals were identified by the instrument package. L-events were the only signal classification with a hypothesized lunar surface origin, and with their main characteristics being described as having a long duration (<1 hour) and an emergent initiation. These events would produce a signal that would build up slowly to its peak and then slowly fade to the background level. There was great variability in their character and occurrence, being detected by both the long-period and short-period seismometers. This type of signal was detected 83 times during the Apollo 11 missions at an average of 4 per day. The origins of these signals were suggested to be either meteoroid impacts or shallow moonquakes and the frequency matched predictions previously made. I-events and X-events were suggested to be the result of either the relief of stresses in the vehicle due to heat expansion or the result of micro-meteoroids impacting either the Lunar Module or the experiment package.

A-events were anthropogenic in origin. While the Apollo 11 astronauts were present on the Moon, the PSEP detected many seismic signals in relation to their activities, mainly on the short period/high frequency vertical seismograph. This included the astronauts' footfalls on the lunar surface, or when in direct physical contact with the Lunar Module including when Neil Armstrong climbed the module's ladder. The predominant frequency of many type A signals was possibly caused by resonance from the Lunar Module. Items that were either consumable or simply unnecessary for the return journey were ejected from the Lunar Module as trash, forming the first lunar "toss zone" in close proximity to both the lander and the PSEP. Some of those items, such as armrests and portable life-support systems, when striking the lunar surface, generated seismic signals detected by the instrument.

B-events were hypothesized to originate from the Lunar Module itself, being caused by the circulation of gas or liquids through the vehicle and in the portable life-support systems. These signals saw an increase in their predominant frequency during the Lunar Module's time on the surface and it is suggested that this was the result of the use of consumables through the mission duration. M-events were long in duration with large amplitudes but with similar spectra to B-events and may share similar origins from the Lunar Module. T-events had no identifiable origin.

== Instrument failure ==
The experiment was terminated on August 27, 1969, when the experiment package failed to receive and execute commands from Earth.
