= Lunar Ejecta and Meteorites Experiment =

1972–1976 lunar science experiment

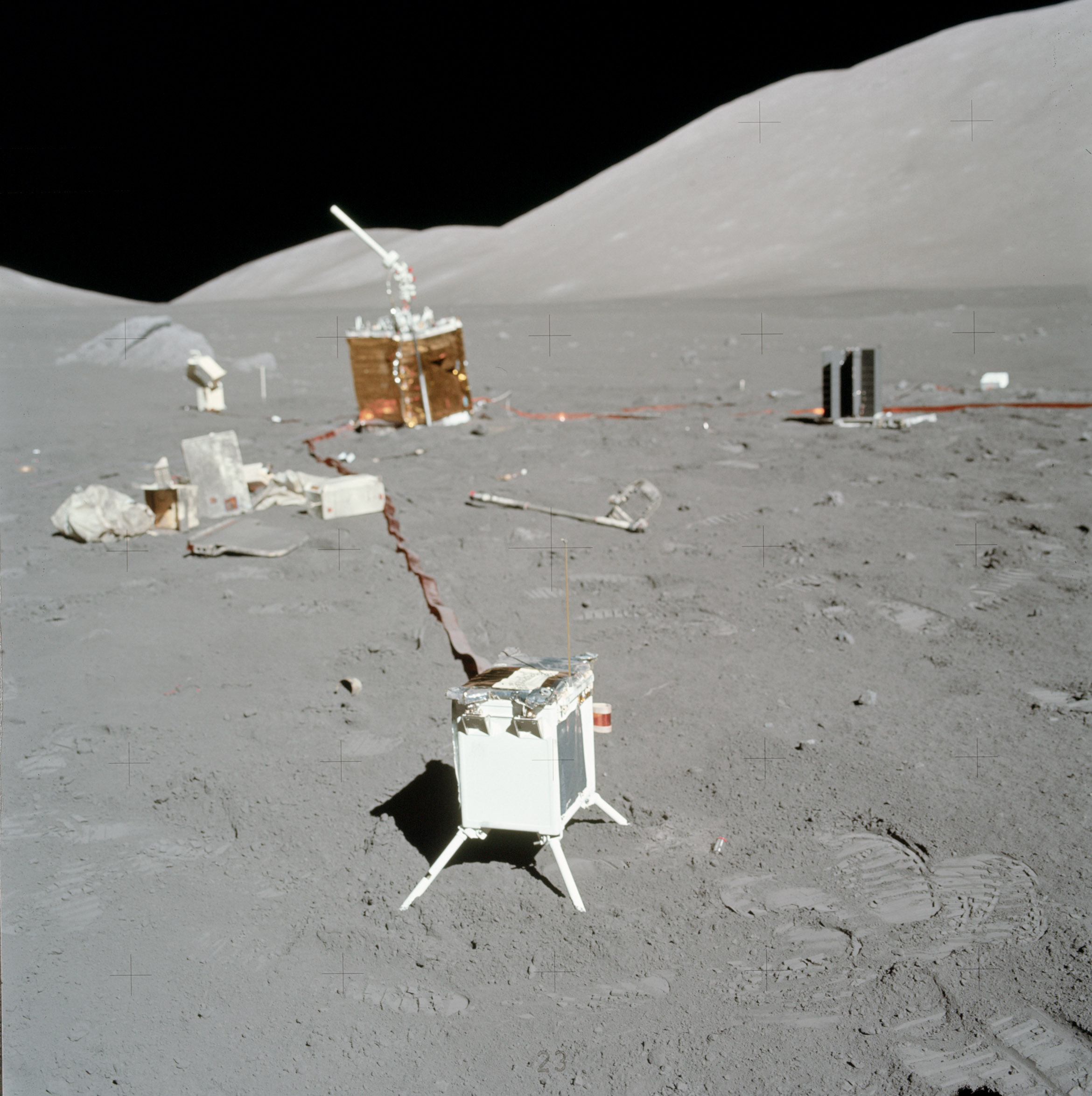
- The Apollo 17 LEAM instrument on the Moon
- Acronym: LEAM
- Notable experiments: Apollo 17

The Lunar Ejecta and Meteorites Experiment (LEAM) was a lunar science experiment that flew to the Moon on board Apollo 17 in 1972. It collected information on dust particles produced as a result of meteoroid impacts on the surface of the Moon.

== Background ==
Instruments on Pioneer 8 and Pioneer 9 were believed to have detected at least two instances of interstellar dust particles. It was therefore believed that the LEAM experiment would be able to distinguish dust particles of interstellar origins from other sources of cosmic dust.

== Instrument ==
The LEAM instrument was designed to ascertain a dust particle's speed, direction, kinetic energy and momentum. LEAM had three detectors: east, west, and up. The east and top sensors consist of a series of pairs of parallel film-grid arrays placed 5 cm (2.0 in) apart. The rear film-grid array was mounted to an acoustic impact plate.

As high-velocity particles enter the detector, they interact with the front film sensor. Some of the particle's kinetic energy results in the creation of an ionised plasmas. Electrons are collected by a positively charged grid. Positive ions are collected on a negatively charged grid. Lower energy high-velocity particles will have all of their kinetic energy used in the creation of plasma and not interact further with the sensor.

High energy high-velocity particles may not generate any plasma at the first grid array and go on to interact with the second film grid and make contact with the rear impact plate generating a second plasma pulse. If the particle's momentum is sufficient it will generate an acoustic signal on the plate. Time of flight through the sensors is recorded to establish the particle's speed. The west sensor omitted the front film array and as a result, could not measure the speed of dust particles. Control sensors were coated with an epoxy resin to isolate them from the ionization products. A control microphone was provisioned in the experiment by having a place one-third the size.

== Apollo 17 ==
The LEAM experiment was deployed along with the rest of the ALSEP experiments near the Apollo 17 landing site in the Taurus-Littrow valley. The instrument was placed northeast of the ALSEP, 7.5 m (25 ft) away. The east sensor axis of the LEAM was aligned to a bearing of 025° to more readily capture interstellar dust particles. The instrument ran for 60 hours during the lunar day and 60 hours during the lunar night with the sensor covers in place to establish a baseline. After this calibration period, the covers were removed by a squib system. During the first attempt to operate the instrument for a full lunar day, the instrument experienced temperatures that far exceeded its design rating and meant the instrument had to be regularly turned off for short periods of time. An investigation by Bendix Corporation hypothesised that the instrument was absorbing a large amount of heat from the environment via the east sensor opening. The instrument continued operations with shutdown time during lunar noon (~8 Earth days) to protect its long-term functionality. As ALSEP was scheduled to be deactivated, the Principal Investigator requested for LEAM to operate through the whole lunar day. On July 8, 1976, the instrument started to overheat and by July 16, 1976, the instrument only returned static data. The instrument did not return any further data after this time. The instrument found that most of the mobile dust particles were low energy particles of lunar origin and detected no potential high energy interstellar dust particle candidates.
