= Heat Flow Experiment =

American moon mission experiment

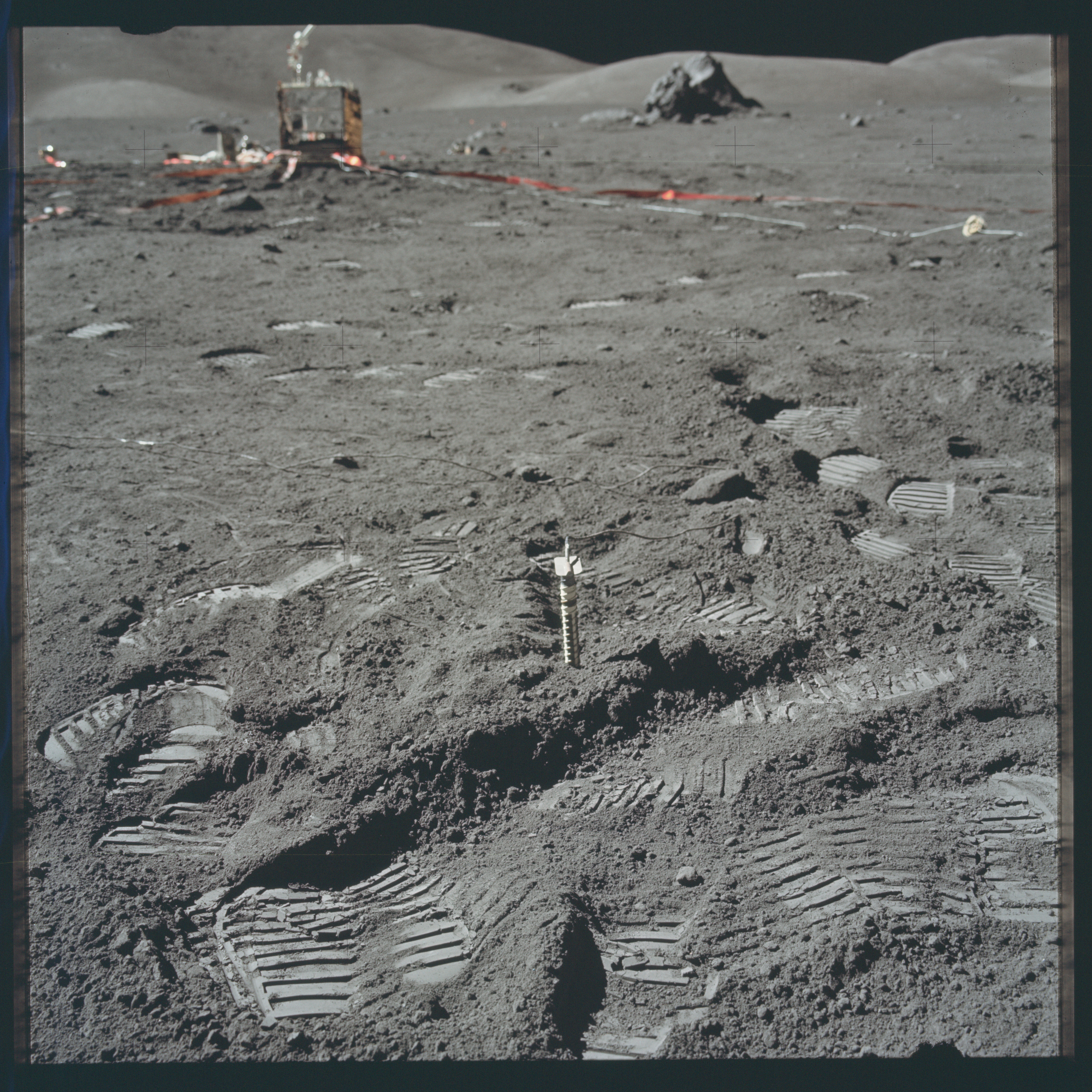
- The Apollo 17 Heat Flow Experiment on the Moon
- Acronym: HFE
- Notable experiments: Apollo 13, 15, 16, 17

The Heat Flow Experiment was a United States NASA lunar science experiment that aimed to measure the rate of heat loss from the surface of the Moon. Four experiments were carried out on board Apollo missions. Two experiments were successfully deployed as part of Apollo 15 and Apollo 17. The instrument on Apollo 16 was deployed but the cable from it to the ALSEP central station was broken and the experiment was rendered inoperable. A heat flow experiment was carried onboard Apollo 13 but the mission was aborted in-flight and the instrument never reached the surface.

== Background ==
Establishing some of the thermal properties of the Moon's surface was already feasible by the time of the Apollo missions. Measuring infrared emissions via telescope and the measuring of microwave emission spectra from the Moon was already possible from the surface of the Earth. These techniques had already established some of the characteristics of the Moon's surface including temperature, thermal conductivity and heat capacity. The interpretation of these observations was limited by the low levels of IR emission, long wavelengths limiting data resolution, and how the Moon's thermal properties vary with depth.

No one person can be attributed with the proposal to measure heat flow from the Moon given the large number of proposals NASA sought from academia, industry and science groups at NASA itself. Several of these proposed such an experiment. The result though was that a small committee was formed to explore how thermal measurements of the Moon could be taken. The committee decided that the focus of any thermal experiment should be focused on heat flow from the Moon's interior.

The committee considered several approaches that included multiple probes and another that included "blankets". The blanket technique was initially ruled out due to the complexity of matching the thermal albedo of the blanket probes with that of the Moon's surface. The method that became the basis for the instrument was a cylindrical heater paired with a temperature sensor a set distance away. Further work by this group established that the probe would need to be inserted into the subsurface to avoid large temperature fluctuations caused by the day-night cycle at the surface. Bendix Corporation was selected as the principal contractor for the instrument and Arthur D. Little was the sub-contractor. Gulton Industries Inc. was selected to develop the electronic circuitry.

Due to the need for the probe to be placed at a depth below the regolith surface, it was known that a drill to penetrate the lunar surface would be required. Development of the drill was led by Martin Marietta, who had previous experience developing tools for NASA.

== Instrument ==
The instrument package consists of two probes, each consisting of two 50 cm (20 in) long sections. Each section end has a gradient thermometer that can measure at two points 28 and 47 cm (11 and 19 in) from each end. Each section can therefore measure temperatures along four points. The cables that connect the probe to the experiment's electronics housing also have 4 thermocouples at 0, 65, 115 and 165 cm (0, 26, 45 and 65 in) from the topmost gradient sensor. Each section end also contains a heater to enable the measurement of material conductivity. Each heater had two power settings, 0.002 W and 0.5 W that would allow an exploration across a range of possible material conductivities. Readings from the experiment were taken either every 7.1 minutes or every 54 seconds depending on the heater mode. The probe sections were placed through the use of the Lunar Surface drill, ideally to a depth of 3 m (10 ft) below the surface.

== Missions ==
=== Apollo 13 ===
The heat flow experiment was originally planned to be carried out on Apollo 13, but due to the aborting of that mission, this did not occur. This instrument burnt up in Earth's atmosphere while still on board the Lunar Module. There was not sufficient time to add the HFE to Apollo 14.

The failure of Apollo 13 was perceived by its principal investigator to have had an impact on the collection of science. The planned landing site for Apollo was found to have a substantial presence of long-lived radioisotope. The project's principal investigator believed that if the Apollo 13 instrument deployment had been attempted, it would have led to better mitigations on later missions for the problems experienced with the drill and the compact regolith.

=== Apollo 15 ===
Drilling of the holes on Apollo 15 was undertaken by David Scott, the mission's commander. After drilling down 100 cm (39 in), the drill started to become ineffective but despite a number of challenges Scott managed to drill down to a depth of 170 cm (67 in). By this point Scott was having to apply his full weight and the decision was made to insert the first probe to prove out functionality. A second drill hole was started but difficulties with drilling were experienced immediately and finishing of the second drill hole was delayed for the second mission EVA. The second drill hole only managed to make a depth of 100 cm and the probe was not fully below the lunar surface. Despite these difficulties, the probes were able to take readings.

The cause of the challenges was due to the deeper levels of the lunar soil not having been disturbed for at least half a billion years. This resulted in extreme compaction that meant further compression of the material could not occur without large amounts of force.

=== Apollo 16 ===
On Apollo 16 the holes for the probes were dug by Charles Duke who managed to drill down to 3 m (10 ft) below the surface. The drill on Apollo 16 had been modified to rectify the issues experienced on the prior mission, Apollo 15. The experiment came to an end before it started when John Young tripped over the cable connecting the experiment to the ALSEP central station. The cabling was designed to resist tensile strains from being tugged, but it was not designed to resist tearing motions. Repairing was considered but rejected due to it needing several hours of surface time.

=== Apollo 17 ===
Both of the Apollo 17 boreholes were drilled without problem and both probes were installed without issue, continuing to operate for several years.

== Science ==
The experiment found that the very near surface of the lunar regolith, consisting of a few centimeters, was dominated by the radiative transfer of heat. This is primarily because the material is fairly loose, with limited soil particle contact reducing conductive transfer. During the lunar noon, 70% of all heat transfer was radiative. After the first 2 to 3 cm (0.8 to 1.2 in), the soil compaction increases and the subsequent density increases from 1.1–1.2 g/cc to 1.75–2.1 g/cc. The result is a substantially increased conductivity.

The HFE found a thermal gradient of between 1.5–2.0 K/m with a heat flow of around 17 mW/m^{2}. When accounting for measurement uncertainty, this aligned well with seismic and magnetic data. This would imply temperatures that would be relatively close to melting at depths of around 300 km (190 mi).

== See also ==
- Heat Flow and Physical Properties Package
