= Lunar Atmospheric Composition Experiment =

The Lunar Atmospheric Composition Experiment (LACE) was a miniature magnetic deflection mass spectrometer (neutral mass spectrometer). The experiment's aim was to study the composition and variations of the lunar atmosphere. The only deployment of LACE was as part of the Apollo Lunar Surface Experiments Package (ALSEP) on Apollo 17 within the Taurus–Littrow valley.

LACE was a follow-on to the Cold Cathode Gauges that were flown on Apollo 14 and Apollo 15. Those experiments proved the existence of a tenuous lunar atmosphere and determined the upper bounds on the lunar atmospheric density during the lunar day and night, but left its composition unknown.

== Instrument ==
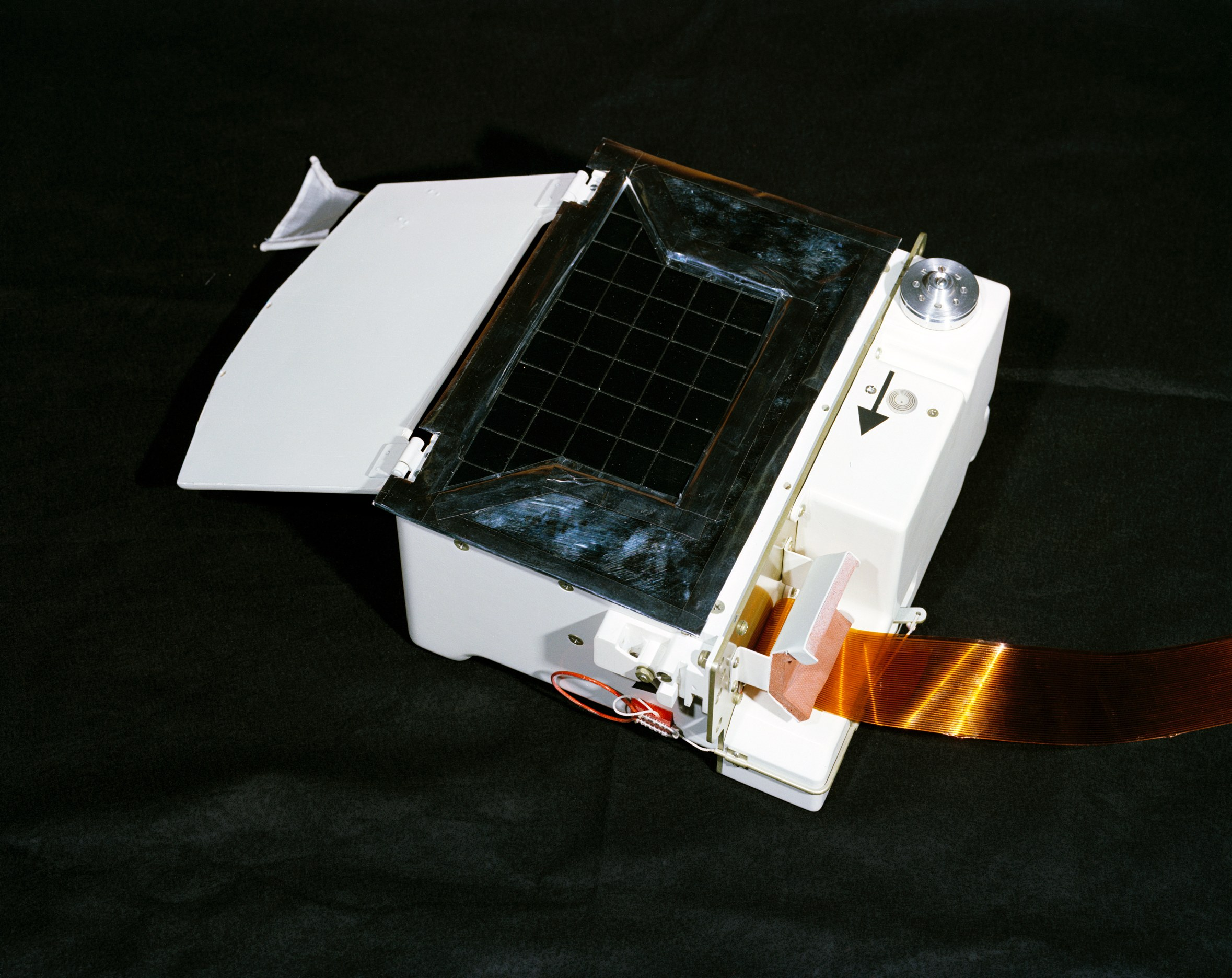
Pre-flight lab photo of the LACE.

As gas molecules enter the experiment's aperture, they are ionised by electron bombardment. These gas ions are then collimated into a beam and passed through a magnetic analyser to the detector. The electron-ion sources consist of two filaments, composed of 99% tungsten and 1% rhenium. Multiple ion mass-ranges could be scanned simultaneously by varying the voltage across the electron-ion source. Each mass range had an independent system for counting ions. Each system consisted of an electron multiplier, pulse amplifier, discriminator and counter. The experiment could detect ions of 28 and 64 atomic mass units at the same time, enabling the simultaneous measurement of carbon monoxide and sulphur dioxide.

LACE's instrument recording accuracy remained at 1% for all 21-bit counts. During calibration of the instrument, it was discovered that ion flux, hitting the detector at over 5×10^{5} counts/sec, resulted in saturation of the counter.

== Deployment and operation ==
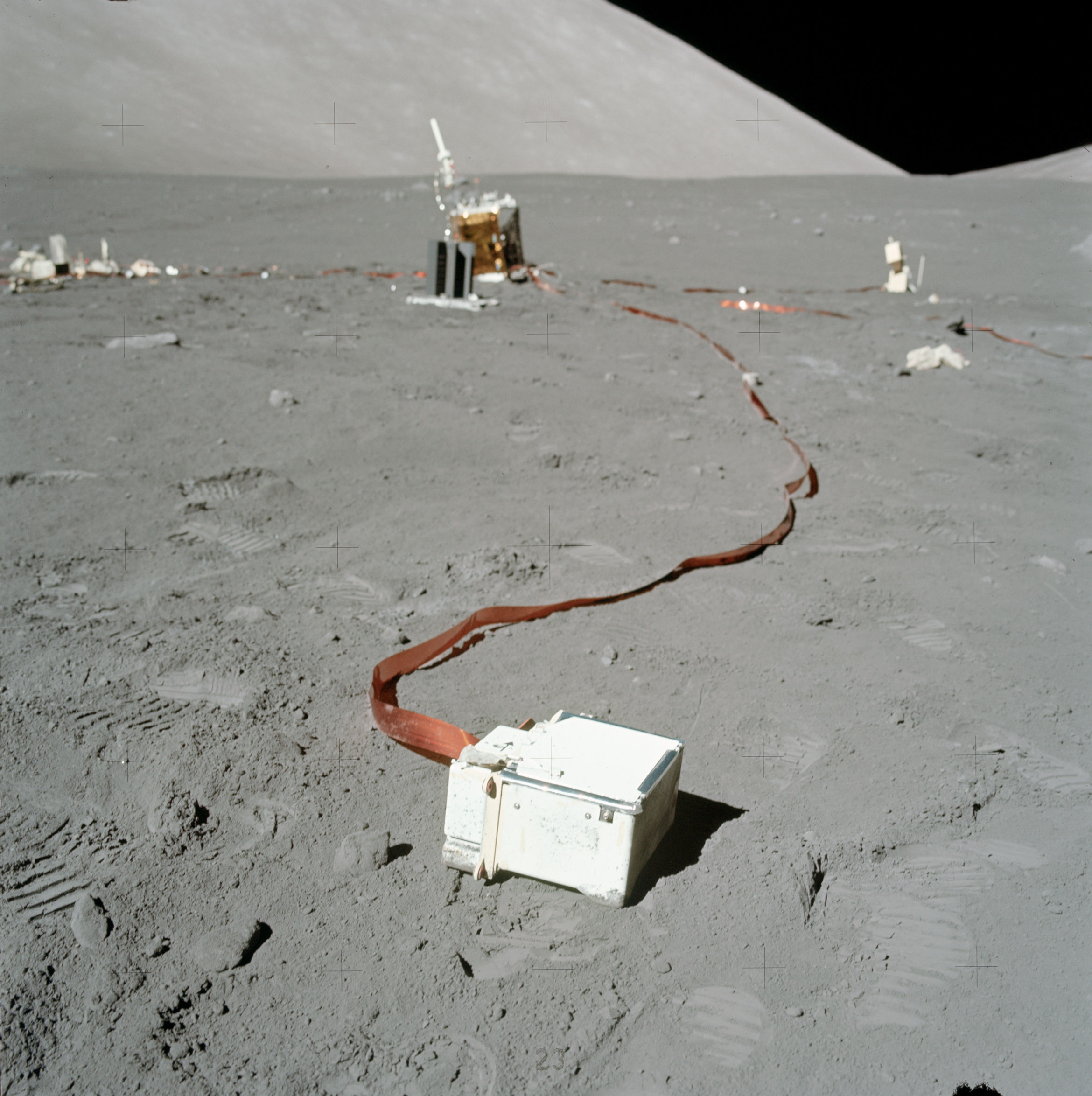
Apollo 17 Lunar Atmospheric Composition Experiment

LACE was deployed by the Apollo 17 astronauts on 12 December 1972, at roughly 05:00 UTC. The entrance aperture was deployed upwards to measure the downward flux of gases at the lunar surface. A nylon dust screen covered the upward-facing aperture to protect it during mission surface activities. This dust screen was pulled back by radio command after the crew had taken off and the seismic charges had been detonated. The instrument was turned on by ground command at 18:07 UTC, 27 December 1972; approximately 50 hours after the first sunset following deployment.

At sunrise, it was found that heating of the experiment site and LACE's instruments resulted in high rates of outgassing. This resulted in a need to limit the operation of LACE during the day except for a brief check near noon. The persistent high daytime outgassing rates severely curtailed instrument operation throughout its history because of the fear that high background rates would degrade instrument sensitivity over time.

Due to the operation of the ion filament, temperature increases resulted in unexpected evaporation of tungsten in the filament. As a result, as part of LACEs operation, the ion source would be disabled to enable the cooldown of the instrument. This would reduce internal outgassing and produce clean mass spectra. The benefit of this tungsten evaporation was that it enabled a constant check on instrument sensitivity, which remained stable.

== Results ==
The experiment positively identified that the tenuous lunar atmosphere consisted of helium, neon and argon. Helium concentrations matched predictions that assumed most of the lunar helium was derived from the solar wind and that helium does not freeze on the lunar surface. Argon (^{36}Ar and ^{40}Ar) was detected. Since the increase of argon concentrations occurred just prior to dawn, it was shown that argon was likely a condensible gas. It was proposed that the argon freezes out and is adsorbed on the lunar surface at night. As night transitions into day, this frozen argon becomes mobile and migrates ahead of, and in tandem with, the sunrise terminator. This was colloquially referred to in the Apollo 17 preliminary science report as a "pre-dawn breeze". Since the source of ^{40}Ar was likely radioactive decay of potassium (^{40}K), its presence detected by LACE provided evidence of a true native lunar gas.

The total density of all the known gases detected by LACE matches that found by the Cold Cathode Gauges.

Other species were identified including molecular hydrogen, chlorine, oxygen, hydrogen chloride, and carbon dioxide. Concentrations of these declined throughout the operation of the experiment and it is suspected these constituted instrument contaminants. This conclusion was reached due to the fact that, unlike argon, the detection of these contaminants rose sharply contemporaneously with the local sunrise, rather than leading it. Neon concentrations were 20 times lower than anticipated and the reason for this was not understood at the time.

== Instrument failure ==
During LACE's tenth lunar month of operation, the experiment developed a problem with the instrument's high-voltage section. The sweep high voltage dropped to zero on 17 October 1973 at 17:32 UTC. The normal 2900 volt output had reduced to several hundred volts, and the instrument could no longer operate. Numerous corrective measures were attempted, but none were successful.
