= Solar Wind Spectrometer =

Scientific package that flew on Apollo 12 and Apollo 15

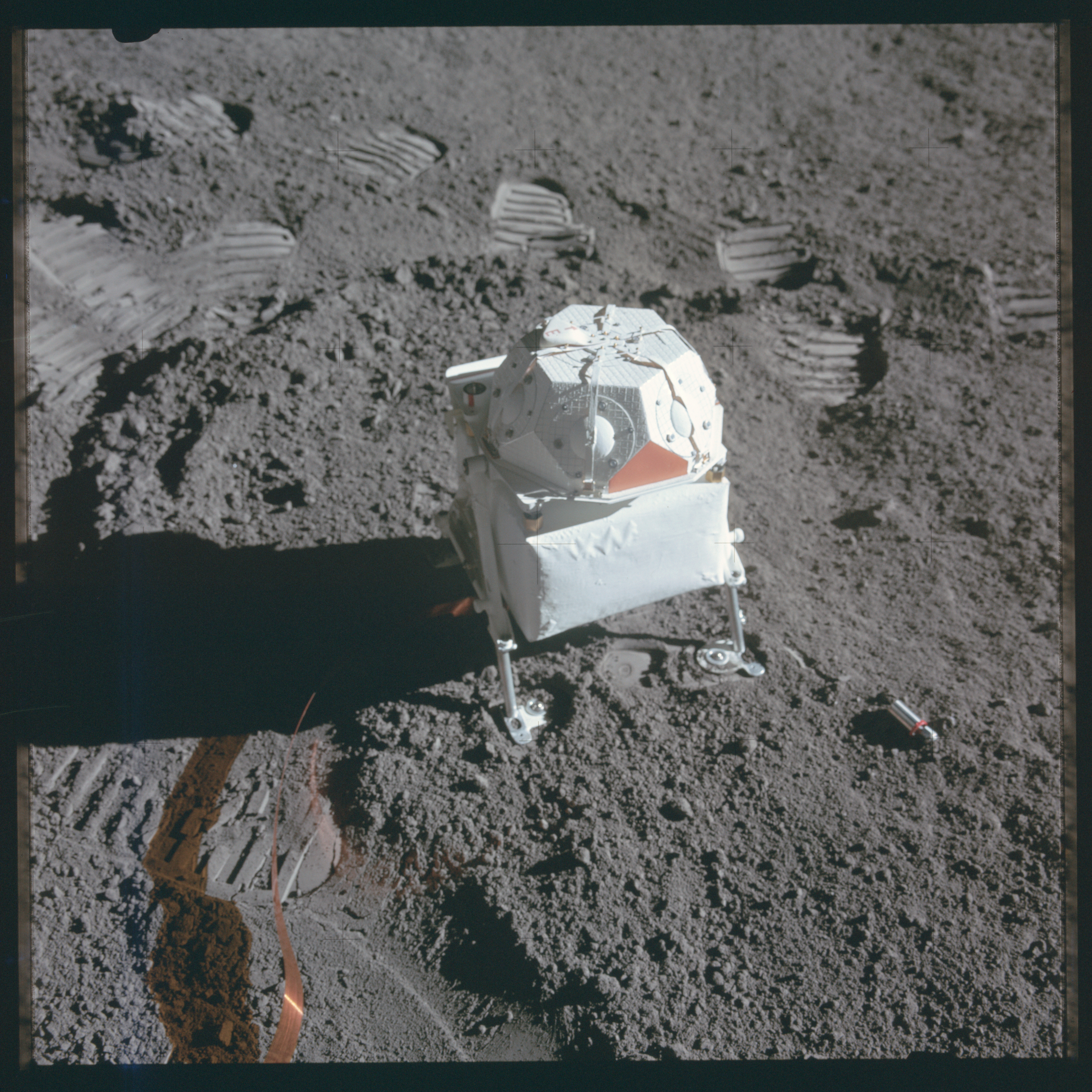
- The Apollo 15 Solar Wind Spectrometer experiment on the Moon
- Acronym: SWS
- Notable experiments: Apollo 12 and Apollo 15

The Solar Wind Spectrometer was a scientific package that flew on the Apollo 12 and Apollo 15 missions to the surface of the Moon. The goal was to characterise the solar wind near the Moon's surface and to explore its interactions with the lunar environment. The experiments' principal investigator was Dr Conway W. Snyder of the Jet Propulsion Laboratory.

== Instrument ==
The Solar Wind Spectrometer (SWS) experiment aimed to provide the ability "to measure energies, densities, incidence angles and temporal variations of the solar wind plasma that strikes the surface of the moon". The experiment instrument consist of seven Faraday cups, that measure the amount of charged particles. One central cup points perpendicularly to the surface. The other six cups are angled at 30 degrees from the surface, located around the central cup in 60-degree intervals. Each cup can measure incoming negatively charged electron flow and positively charged proton-alpha particle flow. The angle of the incoming particle was measured by using readings from all Faraday cups.

Below the instrument was an electronics package located in a container with active thermal control. The electronics packages consists of power control circuits, sensor voltage control, ammeter circuits, and finally signal/data conditioning circuits. Thermal control was provided by three radiators, a sunshield and insulation.

== Missions ==
=== Apollo 12 ===
The Apollo 12 Solar Wind Spectrometer was deployed by astronaut Pete Conrad on the surface of the Moon on November 19, 1969. It was located at 3S, 23W. The instrument's initial state had dust covers over the Faraday cup entrances. During the early phase of the experiment's activation with the dust covers in place, background baseline data was collected. One hour after the departure of the Apollo 12 Lunar Module ascent stage at 15:25 on November 20, 1969, the dust covers were removed and the sensors exposed directly to the lunar environment.

=== Apollo 15 ===
The Apollo 15 Solar Wind Spectrometer was deployed on the surface of the Moon on July 31, 1971, and was powered on at 19:37 UTC. It was located at 26N, 4E. The instrument's initial state had dust covers over the Faraday cup entrances. During the early phase of the experiment's activation with the dust covers in place, background baseline data was collected. One hour after the departure of the Apollo 15 Lunar Module ascent stage on August 2, 1971, the dust covers were removed and the sensors exposed directly to the lunar environment.

== Science ==
Analysis of the two instruments' data found that the solar plasma found near to the lunar regolith surface was broadly similar to the solar plasma measured by probes some distance from the Moon. It also found that no plasma is detectable in the shadow of the Moon during the lunar night. The instrument was also able to distinguish plasma within interplanetary space and that found in the Earth's magnetosheath. Magnetosheath plasma would exhibit large and frequent changes in plasma velocity, density and speed. Highly variable spectra were observed at lunar sunrise, potentially due to interactions with the lunar surface.

Solar Wind Spectrometer data that was analysed after the landing of Apollo 14, confirmed the presence of a photoelectric layer and similar in nature to that found by the Charged Particle Lunar Environment Experiment.

The instrument detected a neutral gas-ion shockwave produced by the impact of the Apollo 13 S-IVB stage on the lunar surface. It was suggested that the source of this gas shockwave may be a result of the vaporisation of 1100 kg of plastic materials contained with the rocket stage. The shockwave was estimated to have travelled 140 km at a speed of 2 km/s.
