= Lunar Surface Magnetometer =

Apollo lunar science experiment

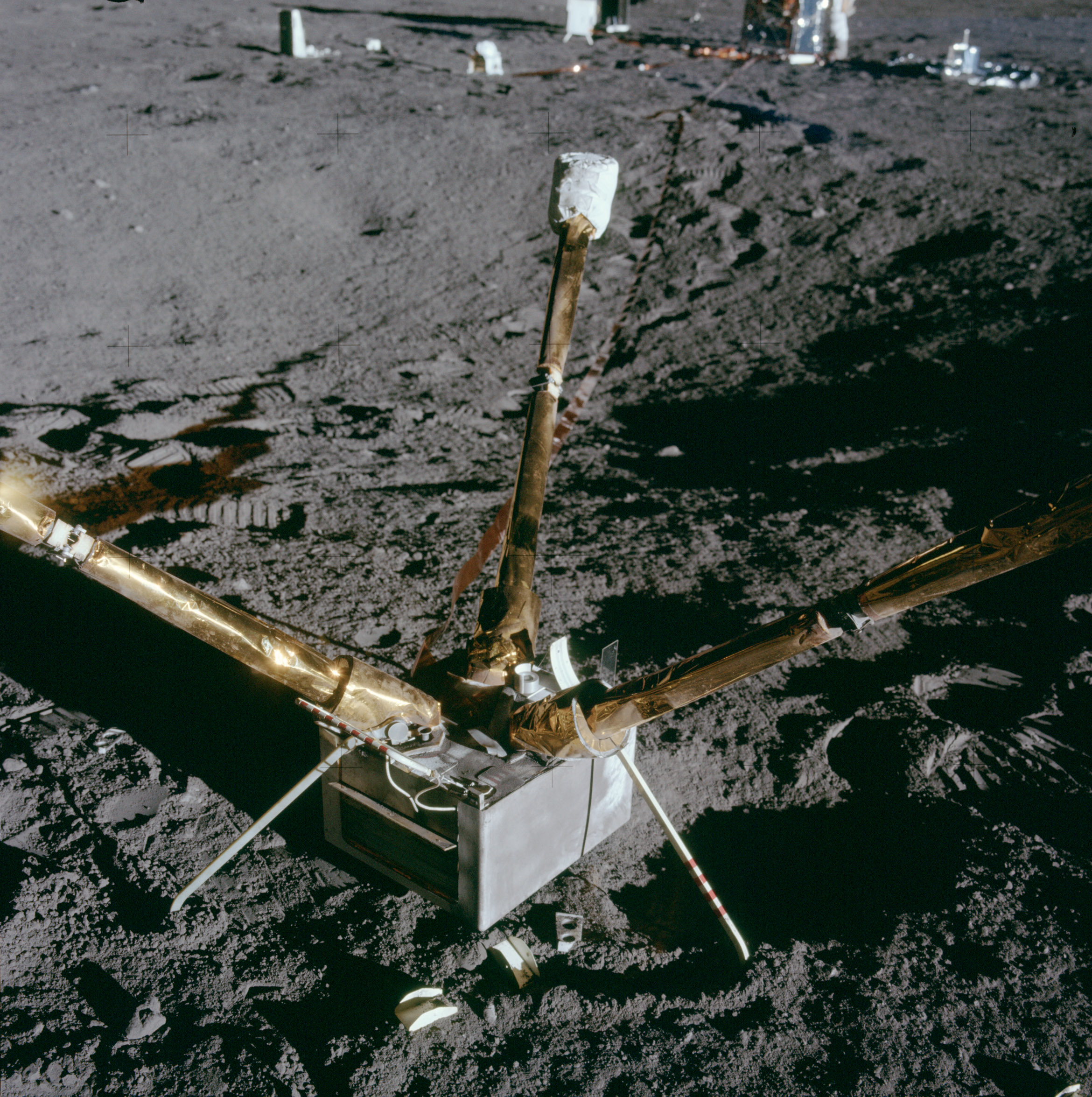
- The Apollo 12 Lunar Surface Magnetometer experiment on the Moon
- Acronym: LSM
- Notable experiments: Apollo 12, 14, and 16

The Lunar Surface Magnetometer (LSM) was a lunar science experiment with the aim of providing insights into the interior of the Moon and how its latent magnetic field interacts with the solar wind. It was deployed on the Moon as part of Apollo 12, Apollo 14 and Apollo 16 missions.

== Background ==
Two lunar orbital satellites, Luna 10 and Explorer 35, laid much of the groundwork for a working understanding of the Moon's magnetic field. They established that the Moon has at best little more than a remnant field, and at worst no intrinsic magnetic field at all. Those spacecraft's instruments were not sensitive enough, and too far from the Moon's surface to distinguish between these two possibilities. In addition to these two missions, analysis had been conducted on regolith samples brought back from the Moon by Apollo 11. This analysis established some of the surface materials' magnetic properties.

== Instrument ==
A lunar magnetometer experiment had a number of requirements that shaped its capabilities. The instrument needed to be able to operate during the lunar night since it was believed the collection of data from a full lunar rotation would be required. The instrument also needed to be able to perform its own self-calibrations on a regular cadence to account for wide temperature ranges experienced over a long period of time.

The instrument's main magnetic measurements were calculated from three Ames fluxgate magnetometer sensor heads, located at the end of three 100 cm (39 in) booms, positioned perpendicular to each other. Each sensor consists of a flattened toroidal core made of permalloy tape placed inside a wound sensing element. The sensors could be gimballed by motors, controlled either from commands sent from Earth or from commands generated by the Apollo Lunar Surface Experiments Package (ALSEP). These sensors were thermally controlled by thermistors driving the operation of resistance heaters. Alignment and positional measurement of the instrument were provided by two features: the onboard gravimeters that measured the tilt-angle of the magnetometer, and a sundial or "shadowgraph" that enabled astronauts to take an azimuthal reading. The sensor booms were folded to facilitate easier stowage and reduced strain during transportation during flight. When deployed, the three sensors were situated 75 cm (30 in) above the ground at a 35-degree angle from the surface.

To be able to measure the magnetic properties of the Moon as a whole, instrument placement would need to avoid any localised nickel-iron/stoney-iron material. If this material was magnetized or capable of producing localised induction fields, this would result in incorrect readings of the Moon-wide magnetic field.

The magnetometer received its power from a 70 watt radioisotope thermoelectric generator that provided power to a number of ALSEP instruments which enabled the LSM to operate both day and night. The instrument would on average use 3 watts of power. Power and a connection to the ALSEP radio transmitter were made available via a 15-meter (49 ft) ribbon cable.

== Deployment and missions ==
=== Apollo 12 ===
The first LSM was fully deployed and activated on the Moon at 14:40 UTC November 19, 1969, by astronauts Charles Conrad and Alan Bean, within the Oceanus Procellarum. In the selenographic coordinate system, the instrument was located at 23.35W and 2.97S. The instrument returned the first measurements of a magnetic field intrinsic to the Moon, rather than induced by the solar wind. The instruments detected a field strength of 32-36 nanotesla that was likely produced mainly by a nearby localised magnetised body, between 200 m (660 ft) and 200 km (120 mi) from the magnetometer. This was due to constraints on the lunar magnetic dipole strength due to measurements made simultaneously by Explorer 35, and the ruling out of other artificial sources due to their size. The instrument likely detected a field effect caused by the hydromagnetic flow of the solar wind as it passed the Moon.

=== Apollo 16 ===
While the instrument carried on Apollo 16 was similar to that on Apollo 12, its sensors were upgraded with high stability cores developed by the Naval Ordnance Laboratory.
