= Cold Cathode Gauge Experiment =

Part of the Apollo Lunar Surface Experiments Package (ALSEP)

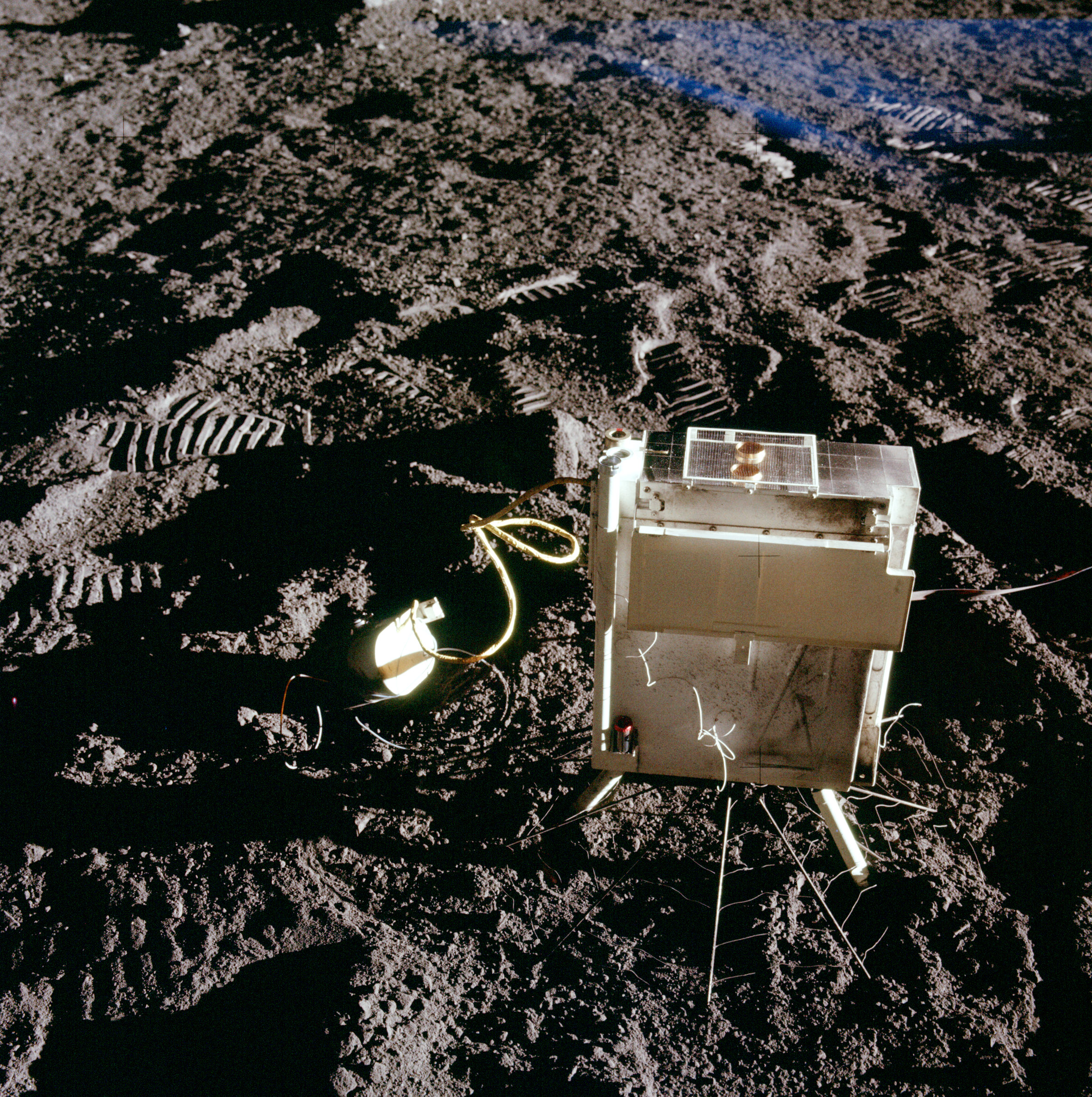
- The Apollo 12 Cold Cathode Gauge Experiment on the Moon
- Acronym: CCGE
- Notable experiments: Apollo 12, 13, 14, and 15

The Cold Cathode Gauge Experiment, also known as the Lunar Atmosphere Detector, was a scientific package that flew on board Apollo 12, Apollo 13, Apollo 14, and Apollo 15. The goal of the experiment was to measure the density of the Moon's tenuous atmosphere, but not its composition.

== Background ==
Prior to lunar exploration it was known that at minimum the lunar atmosphere would consist of solar wind–derived origins but that there may be extant sources of lunar atmosphere that had geochemical origins.

== Instrument ==
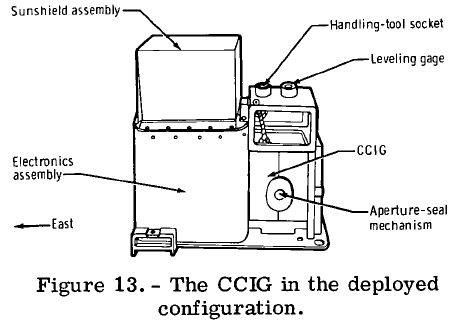
Diagram

The Cold Cathode Gauge Experiment (CCGE) was built by Norton Research Corporation and was included as part of the Apollo program's Apollo Lunar Surface Experiments Package (ALSEP). It was contained as part of the same housing as the Suprathermal Ion Detector Experiment (SIDE) which also housed the electronics for the CCGE. The SIDE command and control circuits also supported the CCGE. The CCGE was separated from SIDE by a 1-metre-long (3 ft 3 in) cable.

The CCGE sensor consists of a spooled cathode surrounded by a cylindrical anode, both made of stainless steel. A voltage of 4500 V is applied to the anode which results in a sustained flow of electrons between the electrodes. Any gas molecules/atoms entering the detector are ionised by the flow of electrons. These ions are then attracted to cathode, whereby the frequency of these ions striking the cathode is a proxy for measuring the gas density. A magnetic field inside the sensor was provided by a permanent magnet.

The entrance to the instrument was closed by a spring-loaded cover that was released via a squib. A temperature sensor allowed corrections to collected data to account for variations in environmental temperature.

Calibration of two gauges, S/N 2 and S/N 12, occurred at the Midwest Research Institute. Gauge S/N 13 was calibrated at Langley Research Center.

== Missions ==
=== Apollo 12 ===
The cold cathode gauge with the Apollo 12 ALSEP package was turned on at approximately 19:18 UTC on November 19, 1969. The Apollo 12 ALSEP central station was located at 3.0094 S latitude, 23.4246 W longitude. The CCGE was deployed approximately 50 feet (15 m) southwest of the central station. After fourteen hours of operation, the instrument experienced a deleterious failure when the power supply to generate the 4500 v potential in the anode failed. Stiffness in the cable made deployment difficult and the gauge was tipped at an angle with gauge facing in an upward direction.

=== Apollo 13 ===
The CCGE was significantly modified for Apollo 13. However, the Apollo 13 mission experienced an in-flight issue whilst en route to the Moon. As a result, the mission to land on the Moon was aborted and the CCGE was not deployed.

=== Apollo 14 ===
Whilst improvements had been made to the cable, there still were some difficulties in deployment; however proper placement was ultimately achieved. The gauge did not have a line of sight of other instruments or the lunar module. Following the failure of the Apollo 12 instrument, the instrument's operations were changed to reduce arcing potential due to gas build up. This included a) allowing a longer time before initialisation of the instrument to allow for degassing of built-up volatiles during transit to the Moon, and b) switching the instrument off during periods of higher temperatures in the event of gas build up during the lunar day.

== Science ==
The instrument would initially provide elevated responses due to gas build up inside the vehicle during transit to the Moon. This would saturate the sensor initially, but after a short period (1 hour during Apollo 12), the instrument would begin to show a perceptible change in readings. The saturation of the instrument limited the ability to use this to assess diffusion of these gases. The instrument could detect the depressurisation of the Lunar Module and the presence of nearby astronauts during lunar surface extravehicular activity due to gases leaking from their PLSS backpacks.

The daytime recordings of gases were substantially greater than those recorded during the lunar night. It is believed that this would frequently be caused by contamination from the lunar excursion modules. These sources would disappear at night, likely owing to freezing out due to the low temperatures. Apollo 14 and 15 found the lunar nighttime atmosphere to correspond with a density of 2 × 10^{11} particles per m^{3}.
