= Suprathermal Ion Detector Experiment =

Part of the Apollo Lunar Surface Experiments Package (ALSEP)

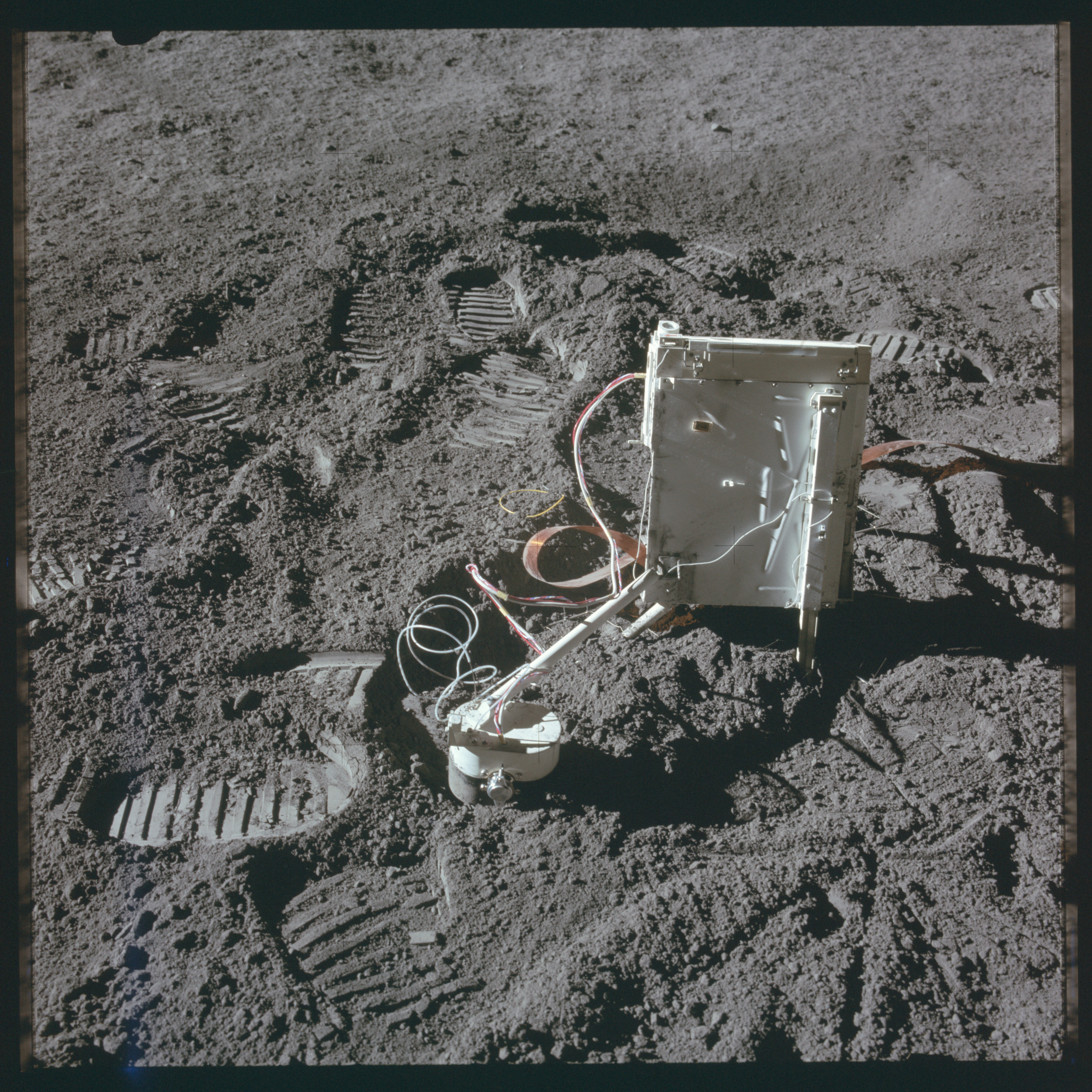
- Suprathermal Ion Detector Experiment (right) with Cold Cathode Gauge Experiment (left) on Apollo 15
- Acronym: SIDE
- Notable experiments: Apollo 12, 14, and 15
- Manufacturer: Bendix Corporation

The Suprathermal Ion Detector Experiment (SIDE) was a lunar science experiment, first deployed by astronauts on the lunar surface in 1969 as part of Apollo 12, and later flying on Apollo 14 and Apollo 15. The goal of SIDE was to study any potential lunar ionosphere and the solar wind.

== Background ==
The idea of landing a positive ion detector on the Moon was first proposed by the lunar science branch of NASA's Manned Space Science Program Office in 1964. If, as was assumed, the Moon did not have any kind of bow shock and limited atmosphere then "daytime" measurements would mostly correlate with the undisturbed solar wind. However, during the lunar night it was believed that due to the presence of either shock limbs or turbulent flow of the solar wind, measurements by a positive ion detector would not simply be of undisturbed solar wind. While experiments for assessing non-ionised gases would be preferred for analysing the Moon's atmosphere, ion detectors and ion spectrometers were more mature technologies.

It was feared that the Lunar Module could release enough gas from its engine exhaust to constitute 5% of the entire potential atmosphere of the Moon and contaminate any results from the experiment.

== Instrument ==
SIDE consists of two positive ion detectors, a mass analyser and a total ion detector, located side by side in a parallel arrangement. The goal of the experiment was to provide mass per unit charge spectra of the positive ions present near the Moon's surface. To mitigate any possible effects of the Moon's regolith having an electric potential that might impact detection of low energy ions, the instrument would sit on top of a wire screen that would apply a variety of charges to counter any potential surface voltage.

The housing for SIDE also housed the electronics for the Cold Cathode Gauge Experiment (CCGE). The SIDE command and control circuits also supported the CCGE. The CCGE was separated from SIDE by a 1-metre-long (3.3 ft) cable.

== Science ==
The experiment found evidence that the limb shock generated a large cloud of hot solar-wind electrons. SIDE also found atmospheric ions were accelerated by the solar wind and would be reimplanted at the terminator. Daytime observations of the lunar atmosphere was made difficult by highly variable solar-wind and extreme-ultraviolet flux.

Whilst the lunar surface daytime electric potential was found to be +10 V, this became -100 V at sunset and sunrise, and -250 V at night. All deployed instruments would regularly detect exhaust gases from the Lunar Module descent and ascent engines, including when the Apollo 14 lunar module ascent stage overflew the Apollo 12 landing site at an altitude of 28 kilometres (17 mi).

The SIDE instrument was key in identifying a new plasma regime in the lobes of the Earth's magnetotail, consisting mostly of low-energy plasma. This plasma consisted most of protons and ionized atomic oxygen and nitrogen, likely derived from the Earth's atmosphere.

=== Lunar water ===
The Apollo 14 SIDE instrument provided the first signal that suggested the presence of water vapour on the Moon. Artificial origins from the Apollo 14 lunar module could not be ruled out. The strength and persistence of the event suggested this was not the result of contamination. The authors of the original study did later revisit and postulate that there were other possible sources and mechanisms for the entrainment and release of water vapour from Apollo 14's ascent stage. While the origins of the water detected by Apollo 14 remain in dispute, the presence of water on the Moon has been confirmed through direct observation by the Stratospheric Observatory for Infrared Astronomy and the Moon Mineralogy Mapper instrument on board Chandrayaan-1. A 2008 study of lunar rock samples revealed evidence of water molecules trapped in volcanic glass beads. A similar study showed how the Moon's solar wind–driven processes could entrain this on the Moon's surface.
