= Charged Particle Lunar Environment Experiment =

Experiment in Apollo 14 mission

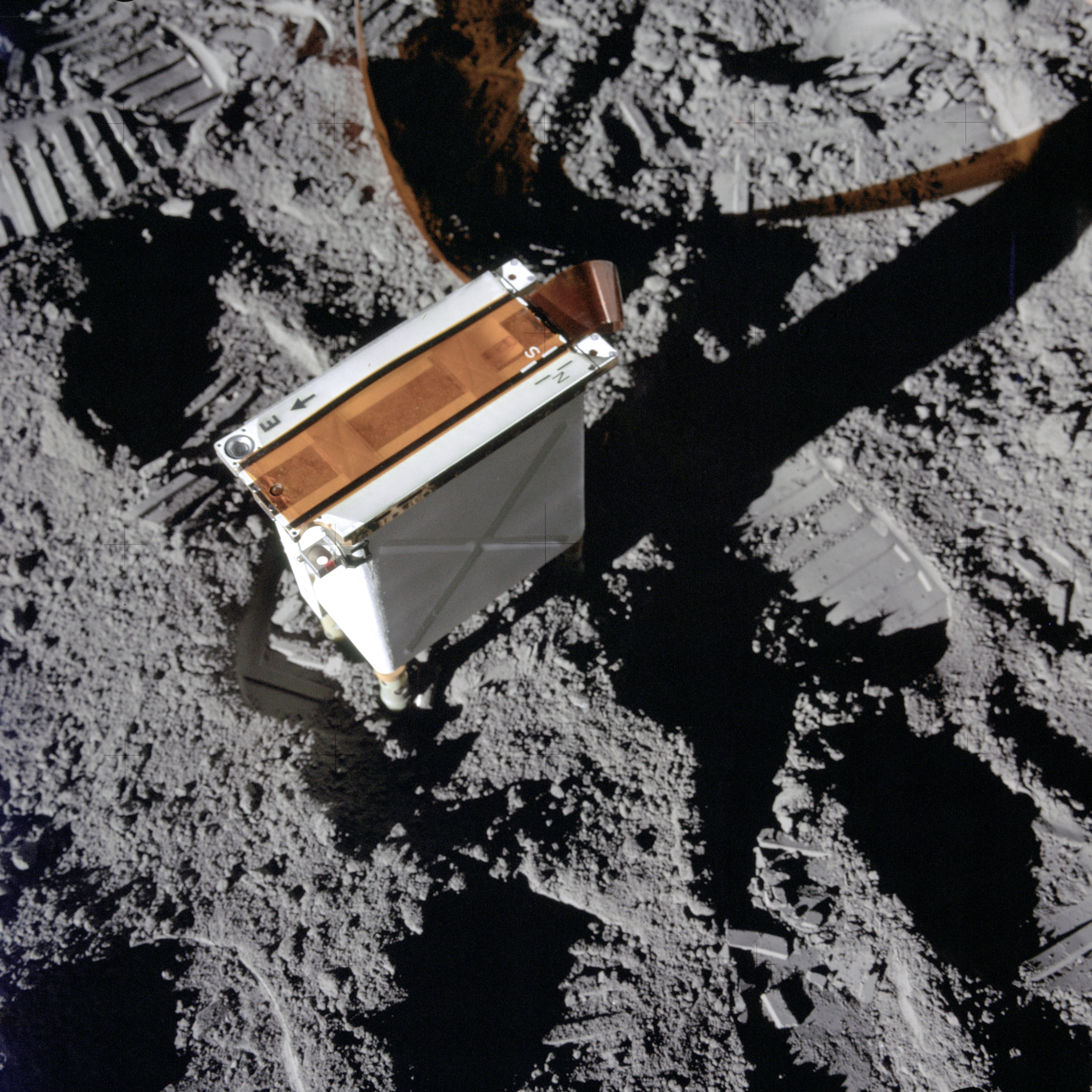
A close-up view of the CPLEE on the Moon's surface

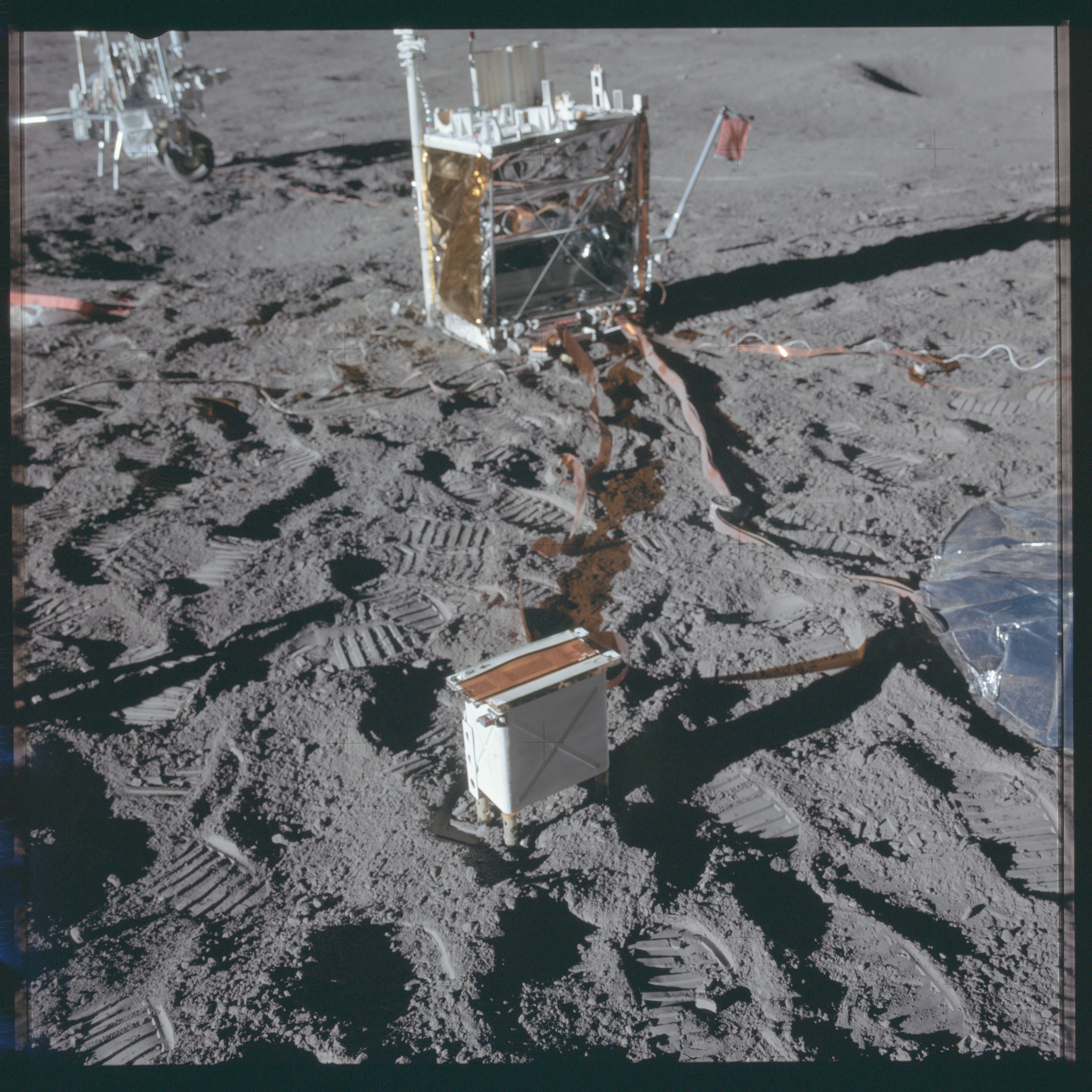
The CPLEE with the ALSEP central station in the background

The Charged Particle Lunar Environment Experiment (CPLEE), placed on the lunar surface by the Apollo 14 mission as part of the Apollo Lunar Surface Experiments Package (ALSEP), was designed to measure the energy spectra of low-energy charged particles striking the lunar surface. It measured the fluxes of electrons and ions with energies from 40 eV to 20 keV. The primary purpose of the experiment was to examine plasma particles originating from the Sun and the low-energy particle flux in the Earth's magnetic tail.

== Design ==
The CPLEE had a mass of 2.7 kg (6.0 lb), a stowed volume of 2540 cubic cm, and used 3.0 W power normally and 6.0 W at night when the survival heater was on. The main part of the instrumentation consisted of two electrostatic analyzers. One of these (analyzer A) pointed toward local lunar vertical, and the other (analyzer B) to a point 60 deg from vertical toward lunar west. Both detectors had fields of view of 4 x 20 degrees; for analyzer A the long axis of the field of view was oriented N-S, and for analyzer B, E-W. As a first approximation, both detectors could be considered to point in the ecliptic plane. Each analyzer consisted of a set of direction-defining slits, deflection plates, five small-aperture (1 mm nominal) C-shaped channel electron multipliers, one large-aperture (8 mm nominal) helical channel electron multiplier and 6 accumulators. For a given voltage applied to the deflection plates, the five small-aperture multipliers were arranged to count particles of one polarity with differing energies, while the large-aperture multiplier simultaneously made a wide-band measurement of particles of the opposite polarity. During each 19.2-s interval in the automatic mode of experiment operation, deflection voltages of zero (twice, for background and calibration) and plus and minus 35, 350, and 3500 were applied to the deflection plates for 2.4 s at each voltage. Each analyzer would make measurements for 1.2 s and transmit while the other analyzer was operating. The little-used manual mode permitted the continuous application of a single deflection voltage, thus increasing temporal resolution for particles in a limited portion of the spectrum. Useful data obtained during each 19.2-s interval (automatic mode) where, for each analyzer, 1.2-s accumulated counts of electrons and ions in 18 energy windows between 40 eV and 20 keV. The windows utilizing all 6 detectors at 35 V are centered roughly at 40, 50, 65, 70, 95, and 200 eV, the windows at 350 V are 10x and at 3500 V are 100x these values. A dust cover with a 63Ni radioactive source on the underside over each aperture for calibration protected the instrument.

The instrument was designed by Australian Professor Brian J. O'Brien, who was a professor in the Department of Space Science at Rice University. After he left Rice University in 1968, his postdoctoral student David L. Reasoner (PhD., 1968) took over the job of PI of the instrument and its data analysis. Two Rice University students earned PhD's analyzing CPLEE data: Frederick J. Rich (PhD, 1973) and Patricia H. Reiff (PhD, 1975).

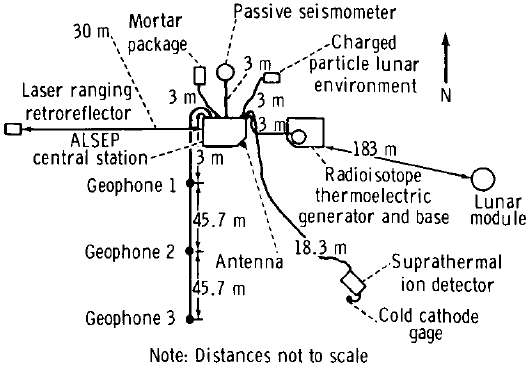
Apollo 14 ALSEP layout

== Timelines ==
The ALSEP central station was located at 3.6440°S 17.4775°W. The charged particle lunar environment experiment was deployed approximately 3 meters northeast of the central station. Leveling to 1.7 degrees, tipped to the east, was accomplished with a bubble level and east-west alignment to within 1 degree with a Sun compass. The instrument was deployed at approximately 18:00 UT on 5 February 1971 and commanded on at 19:00 UT for 5 minutes of functional tests. A checkout procedure was conducted on 6 February from 4:00 to 6:10 UT. Following LM ascent on 6 February at 18:49 UT the dust cover was commanded to be removed at 19:30 UT.

The experiment worked normally from deployment until April 8, 1971, when the power supply for the analyzer pointing away from lunar vertical (analyzer B) failed. The other analyzer continued to function normally until June 6, 1971, when a partial failure of the power supply occurred. Operation of this analyzer was intermittent for the rest of 1971. During most of 1972, operation was continuous during lunar night and intermittent during lunar day because high temperatures caused a low voltage condition in the power supply. From December 1972 to February 1973 operation was continuous, after which time the voltage problems occurred again. The Apollo 14 central station signal was lost on 1 March 1975 and reacquired on 5 March. Loss and reacquisition of signal happened sporadically until termination of the ALSEP experiment. Loss-reacquisition occurred in 1976 on 18 January – 19 February, 17 March – 20 May, 8 June – 10 June, 9 October – 12 November and in 1977 on 30 July – 4 August. The CPLEE experiment was in standby mode when the ALSEP stations were turned off on 30 September 1977.

== See also ==
- Selenography
- List of artificial objects on the Moon
