= Lunar seismology =

Study of ground motions of the Moon

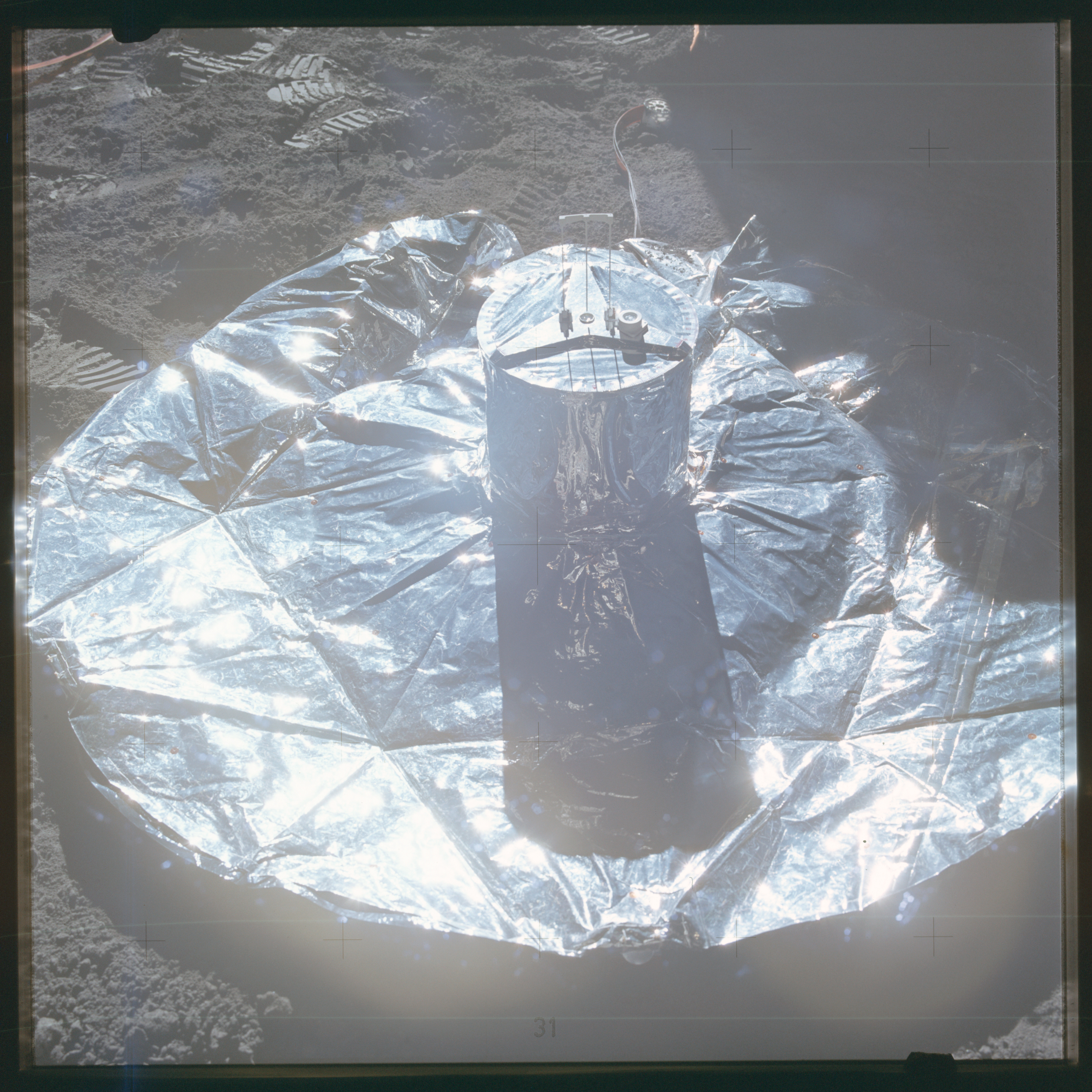
Apollo seismometer

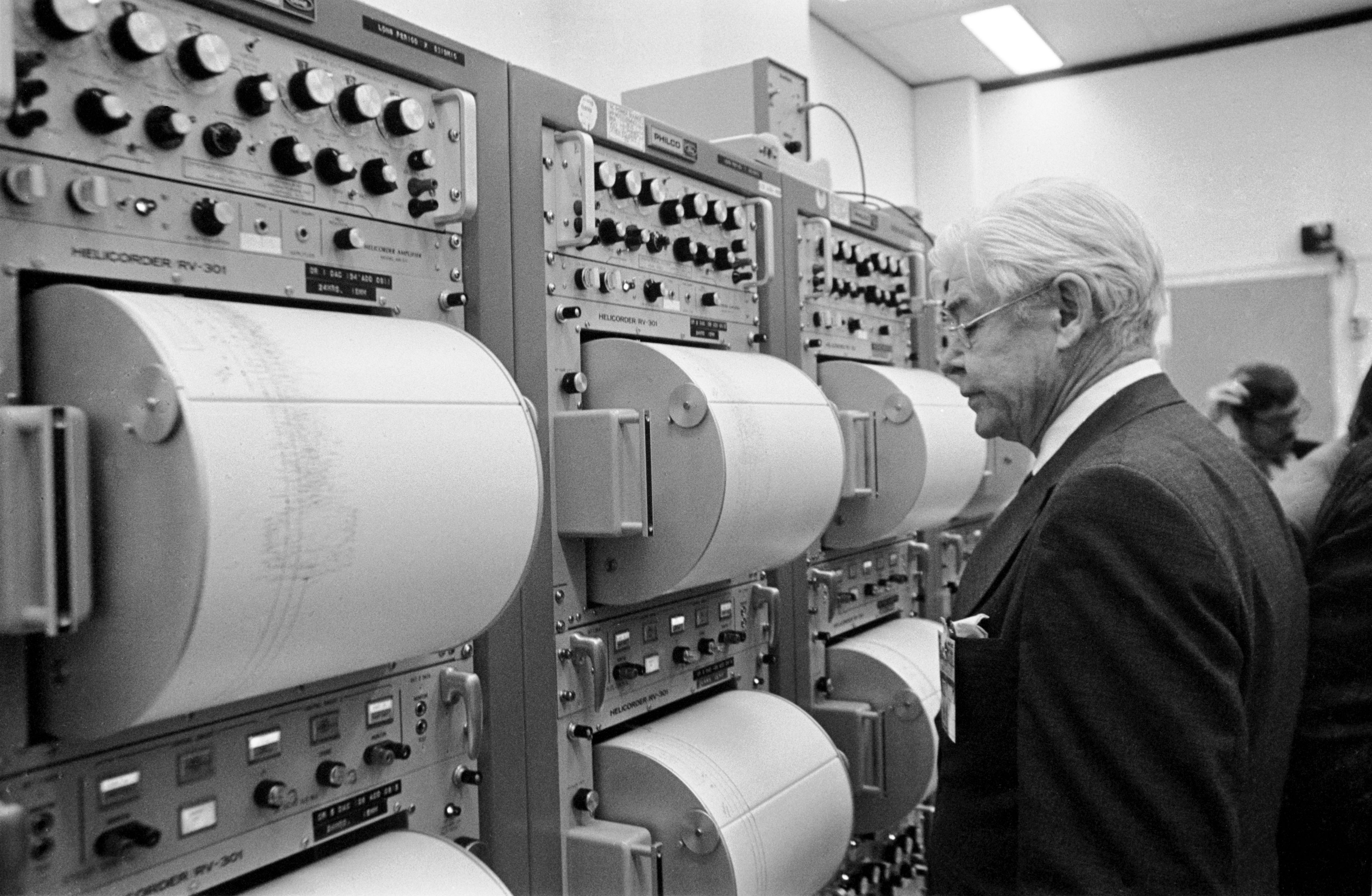
Seismometer readings from the impact made by the Apollo 17 Saturn S-IVB impacting the Lunar surface arrive at NASA

Lunar seismology is the study of ground motions of the Moon and the events, typically impacts or moonquakes, that excite them.

== History ==
Several seismographic measuring systems have already been installed on the Moon and their data made available to scientists (such as those from the Apollo Lunar Surface Experiments Package). The existence of moonquakes was an unexpected discovery from seismometers placed on the Moon by Apollo astronauts from 1969 through 1972. The Apollo 11 instrument functioned through August of the landing year. The instruments placed by the Apollo 12, 14, 15, and 16 missions were functional until they were switched off in 1977. Moonquakes are not believed to be caused by tectonic plate movement (as earthquakes are), but by tidal forces between Earth and the Moon. Further data is needed to clarify the origins and effects of the forces causing moonquakes.

The Chandrayaan-3 mission by Indian Space Research Organisation had a payload ILSA (Instrument for Lunar Seismic Activity), to acquire data about moonquakes. It detected a presumed natural event on 26 August, 2023. It is suspected to be a moonquake.

== Major findings ==
=== Moonquakes ===
Several categories of moonquakes were recorded. Hundreds of deep moonquakes were recorded along with 28 shallow events. The deeper quakes are caused by tidal forces with the Earth and tended to occur in clusters. The shallow events have tectonic origins. Although more rare than deep events, the shallow events were larger, with body wave magnitudes > 5.5 and stress drops exceeding 100 MPa. Other sources of seismic activity included meteorite impacts and artificial signals from lunar modules.

=== Structure of the lunar interior ===
One key finding was an improved understanding of the structure of the deep lunar interior, including the existence of a solid inner-core and sharp core-mantle boundary and a partial-melt layer at the base of the lunar mantle. The solid core has a radius of about 240 km and is surrounded by a much thinner liquid outer core with a thickness of about 90 km. The partial melt layer sits above the liquid outer core and has a thickness of about 150 km. The mantle extends to within 45 ± 5 km of the lunar surface.

== Limitations of the current dataset ==
- Scattering from the megaregolith Strong variations in material properties near the surface of the Moon, likely caused by a long history of impact cratering, are thought to be responsible for the complex seismic waveforms that lack clear reflected arrivals that would provide clear seismological evidence of a lunar core.
- Selenographical distribution All of the Apollo seismometers were placed on the near side of the Moon. The relative dearth of moonquakes observed on the far side of the Moon has been interpreted as either (1) evidence for an attenuating core or (2) observational bias given that it is easier to detect events of a fixed magnitude that are closer to the sensors.

== Future plans ==
Due to the success of the Apollo seismometers, several space agencies including NASA have expressed interest in funding future seismic missions to the Moon. NASA's Planetary Science Decadal Survey for 2012-2022 lists a lunar geophysical network as a recommended New Frontiers mission. The mission would be tasked with enhancing the knowledge of the lunar interior using several identical landers distributed over the lunar surface. A network of arrays would be able to better constrain lunar seismicity, especially on the far side of the Moon.

In early 2018, NASA established the Development and Advancement of Lunar Instrumentation (DALI) program. DALI funds research to support the Science Mission Directorate's Planetary Science Division, including the desired lunar geophysical network. NASA awarded five DALI grants in 2024, including research on ground-penetrating radar and a magnometer system for determining properties of the lunar core.
