= Pete Frank =

NASA engineer

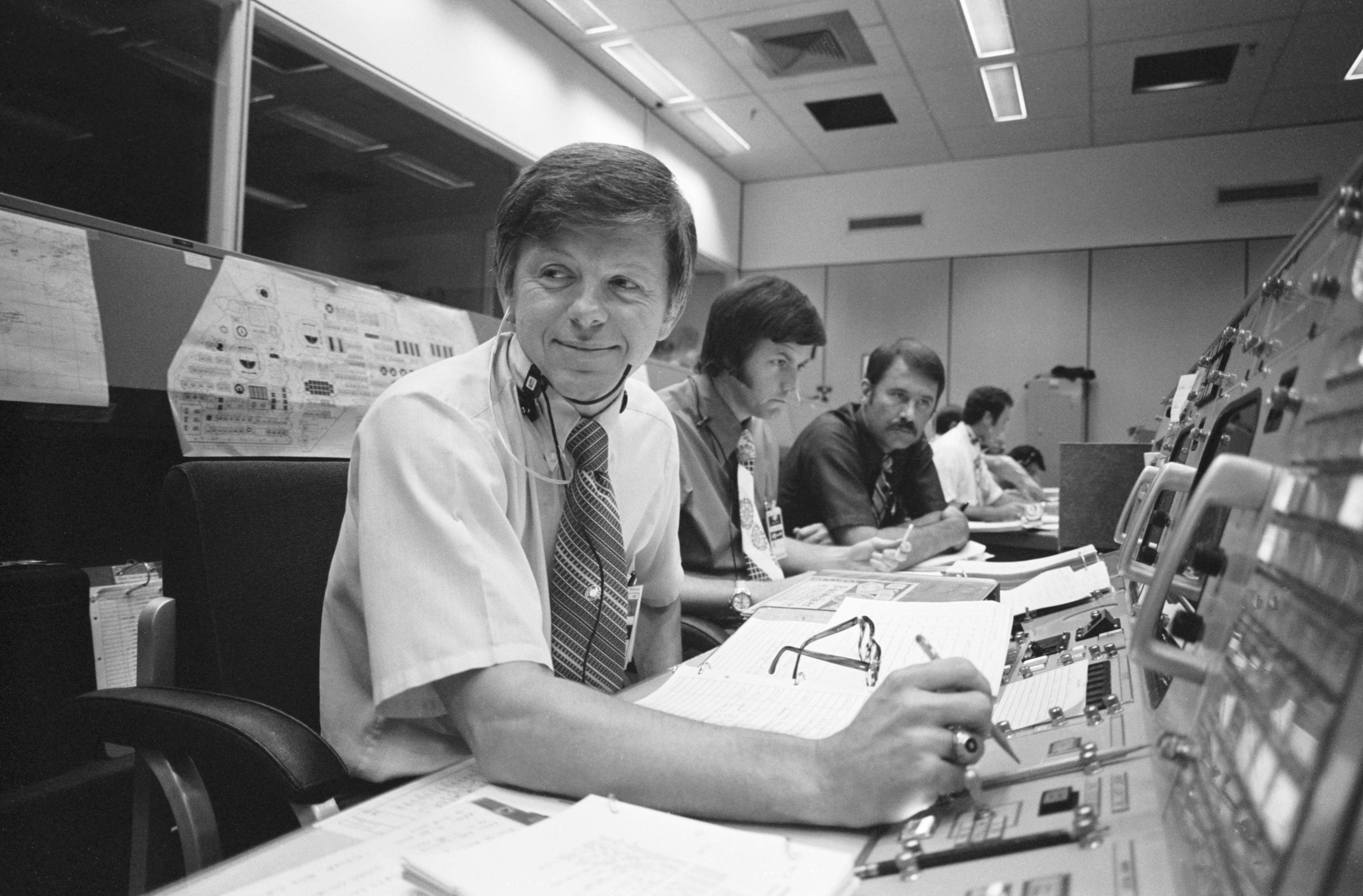
- M. P. Frank (foreground), in the Mission Operations Control Room during the Apollo-Soyuz Test Project
- Born: August 20, 1930; Bryan, Texas, U.S.
- Died: June 22, 2005 (aged 74)
- Resting place: Roselawn Memorial Park, Denton, Texas
- Education: University of Texas (BS); Drexel University (MS)
- Occupations: NASA manager and flight director
- Military career
- Allegiance: United States of America
- Branch: United States Marine Corps
- Rank: Lieutenant Colonel

Pete Frank, also known as M. P. Frank III (August 20, 1930 – June 22, 2005) was a NASA engineer who served as the lead flight director for the Apollo 14 and Apollo 16 crewed lunar landing missions, as well as the American lead flight director for the Apollo-Soyuz Test Project.

== Education ==
M. P. (Pete) Frank III was born in Bryan, Texas. His initials did not stand for anything and he was always known as "Pete". He graduated from Denton High School in 1948, and attended the University of Texas at Austin, receiving a Bachelor of Science degree in aeronautical engineering by 1952. Correction: In the prior paragraph, it was stated that Pete's initials did not stand for anything. This is totally incorrect. He was named after his grandfather, Mordecai Pittman Frank, and his father, Mordecai Pittman Frank Jr. Pete's legal name is Mordecai Pittman Frank, III. As a youth, he did not want to be called by his proper name. My mother, Dora, was sister to his father, who we called Uncle M.P. Pete was very humble and adored by his entire family. We are very proud of all his accomplishments. (submitted by Thomas R. Boettcher, Pete's first cousin)

== Career ==
After college graduation, Frank joined the United States Marine Corps for four years as a pilot, then served in the Reserve, becoming a lieutenant colonel.

While working for the Glenn L. Martin Company in Baltimore, Maryland, Frank earned a master's degree in mechanical engineering at Drexel University in Philadelphia.

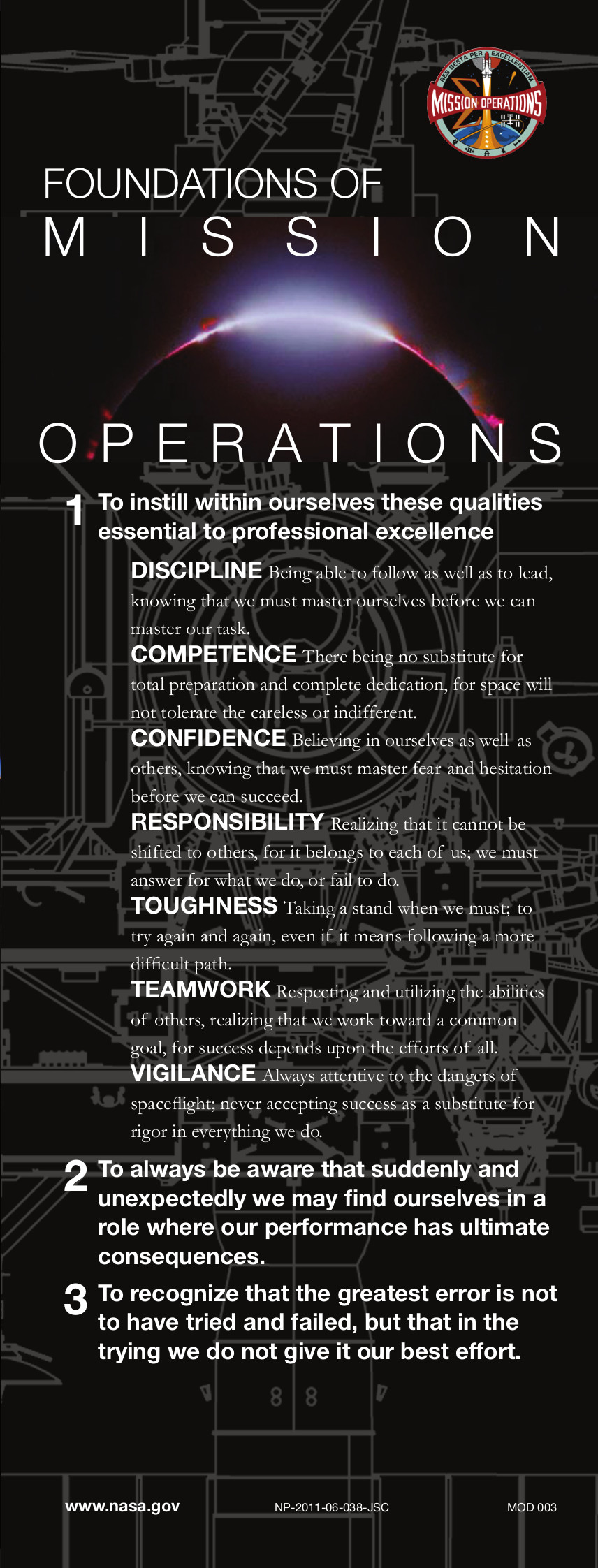
Frank has inspired flight controllers for decades with these words.

Frank joined NASA in 1962.

Frank was one of 44 men selected to report to Brooks Air Force Base for two months for extensive medical testing in January and February 1966 during the recruitment of what would become NASA Astronaut Group 5. He was not chosen among those 19, but was a finalist.

In his January 1999 oral history, flight director Gene Kranz said, "Pete Frank translated the values 'discipline, morale, tough and competent now' into a statement … each controller has an opportunity to reflect as he approaches his role and responsibility in each mission."

Frank took the role of flight director in 1968. He became the eighth director to lead a mission and adopted the team color orange, which was retired when he retired from NASA. Frank, among others, directed Apollo 9, 10, and 12 and 17 Frank was lead director for Apollo 14 and 16. There were typically three to six flight directors per mission, with one serving as a lead director.

Frank served on the internal review board to study the causes of the Apollo 13 onboard explosion, under Dr. Edgar Cortright, Director of the Langley Research Center.

Frank, with other flight controllers and directors on Apollo 14, guided mission commander Alan Shepard, Lunar Module Pilot Edgar Mitchell and Command Module Pilot Stuart Roosa to the Moon on a redesigned Apollo command and service module, completing the mission planned for 13's crew to the Fra Mauro highlands. In 1975, Frank served as the American lead flight director for the Apollo-Soyuz Test Project. Frank would later become chief of the Flight Control Division before his retirement in 1983.

== Post-career and death ==
Frank and his wife supported the Habitat for Humanity organization in fundraising and homebuilding.

Frank died after an auto accident, on June 22, 2005.

== See also ==
- Apollo program
