= Apollo 14 =

Third crewed Moon landing

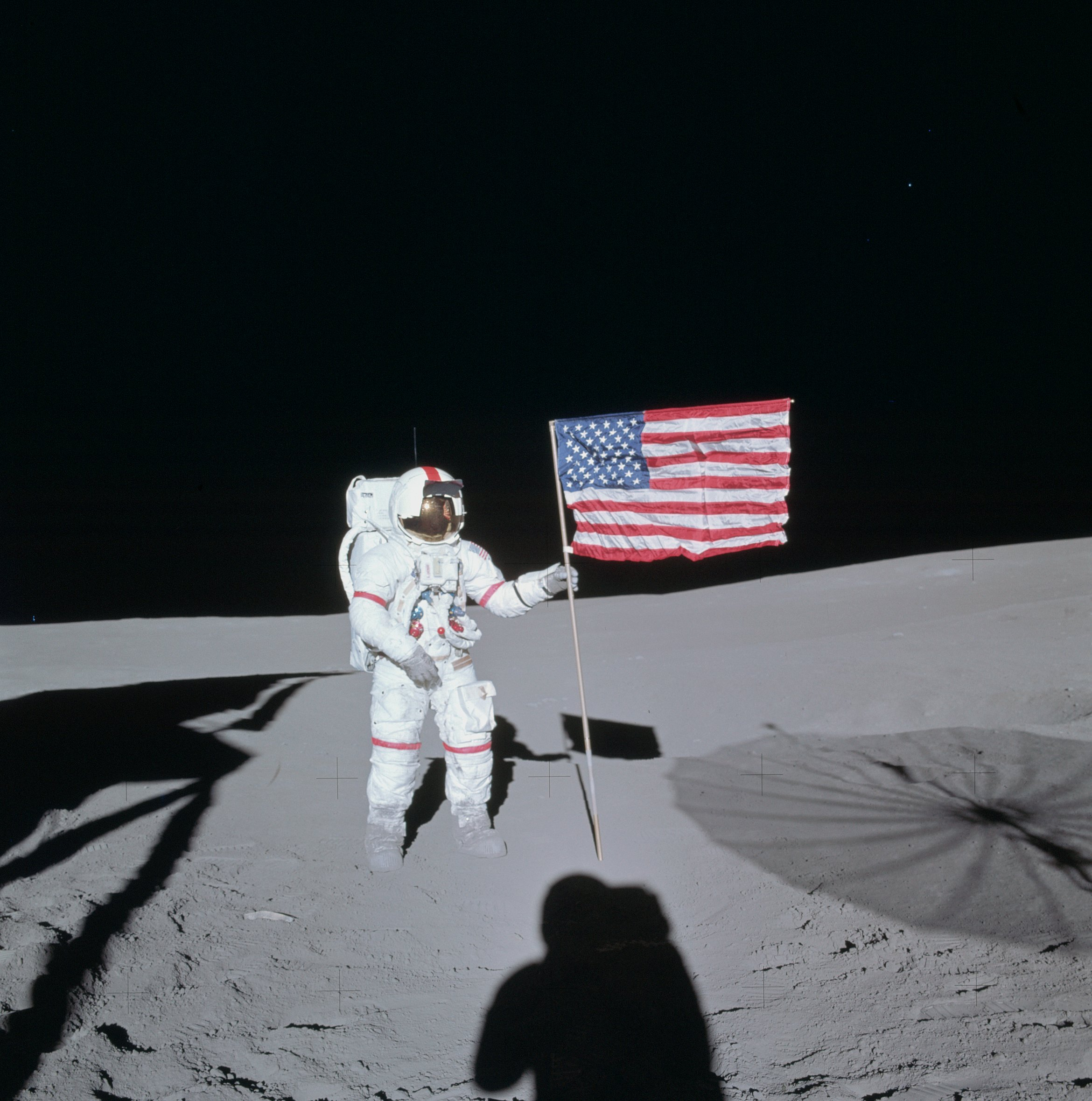
- Alan Shepard and the American flag on the Moon, Apollo 14, February 1971 (photo by Edgar Mitchell)
- Mission type: Crewed lunar landing (H)
- Operator: NASA
- COSPAR ID: CSM: 1971-008A; LM: 1971-008C
- SATCAT no.: CSM: 4900; LM: 4905
- Mission duration: 9 days, 1 minute, 58 seconds

Spacecraft properties
- Spacecraft: Apollo CSM-110; Apollo LM-8
- Manufacturer: CSM: North American Rockwell; LM: Grumman
- Launch mass: 102,084 pounds (46,305 kg)
- Landing mass: 11,481 pounds (5,208 kg)

Crew
- Crew size: 3
- Members: Alan B. Shepard Jr.; Stuart A. Roosa; Edgar D. Mitchell
- Callsign: CSM: Kitty Hawk; LM: Antares

Start of mission
- Launch date: January 31, 1971, 21:03:02 UTC
- Rocket: Saturn V SA-509
- Launch site: Kennedy LC-39A

End of mission
- Recovered by: USS New Orleans
- Landing date: February 9, 1971, 21:05:00 UTC
- Landing site: South Pacific Ocean; 27°1′S 172°39′W

Orbital parameters
- Reference system: Selenocentric
- Periselene altitude: 16.9 kilometers (9.1 nmi)
- Aposelene altitude: 108.9 kilometers (58.8 nmi)
- Period: 120 minutes

Lunar orbiter
- Spacecraft component: Command and service module
- Orbital insertion: February 4, 1971, 06:59:42 UTC
- Orbital departure: February 7, 1971, 01:39:04 UTC
- Orbits: 34

Lunar lander
- Spacecraft component: Lunar Module
- Landing date: February 5, 1971, 09:18:11 UTC
- Return launch: February 6, 1971, 18:48:42 UTC
- Landing site: Fra Mauro; 3.64530°S 17.47136°W
- Sample mass: 42.80 kilograms (94.35 lb)
- Surface EVAs: 2
- EVA duration: Total: 9 hours, 22 minutes, 31 seconds; 1st: 4 hours, 47 minutes, 50 seconds; 2nd: 4 hours, 34 minutes, 41 seconds

Docking with Lunar Module
- Docking date: February 1, 1971, 01:57:58 UTC
- Undocking date: February 5, 1971, 04:50:43 UTC

Docking with Lunar Module ascent stage
- Docking date: February 6, 1971, 20:35:52 UTC
- Undocking date: February 6, 1971, 22:48:00 UTC
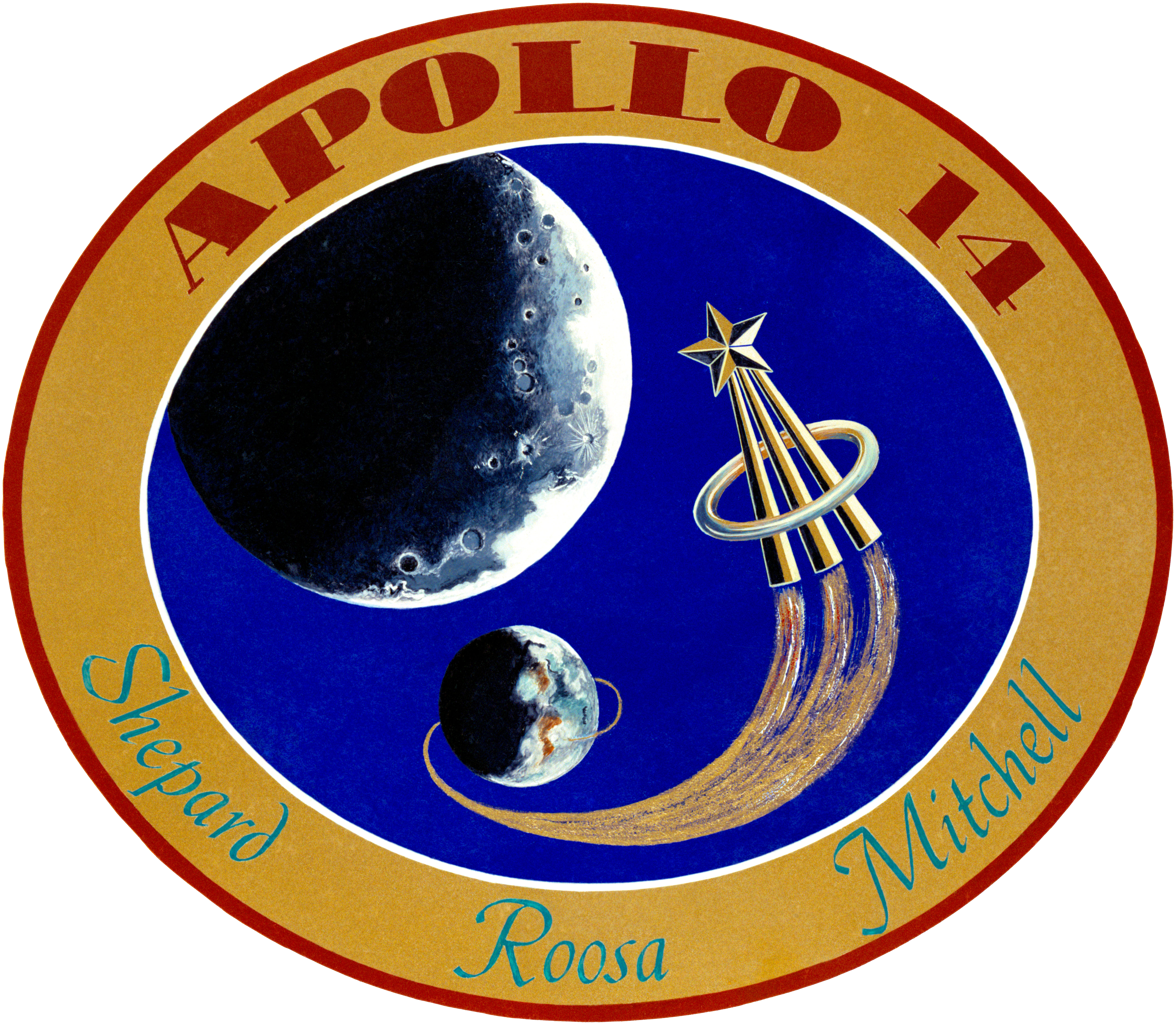
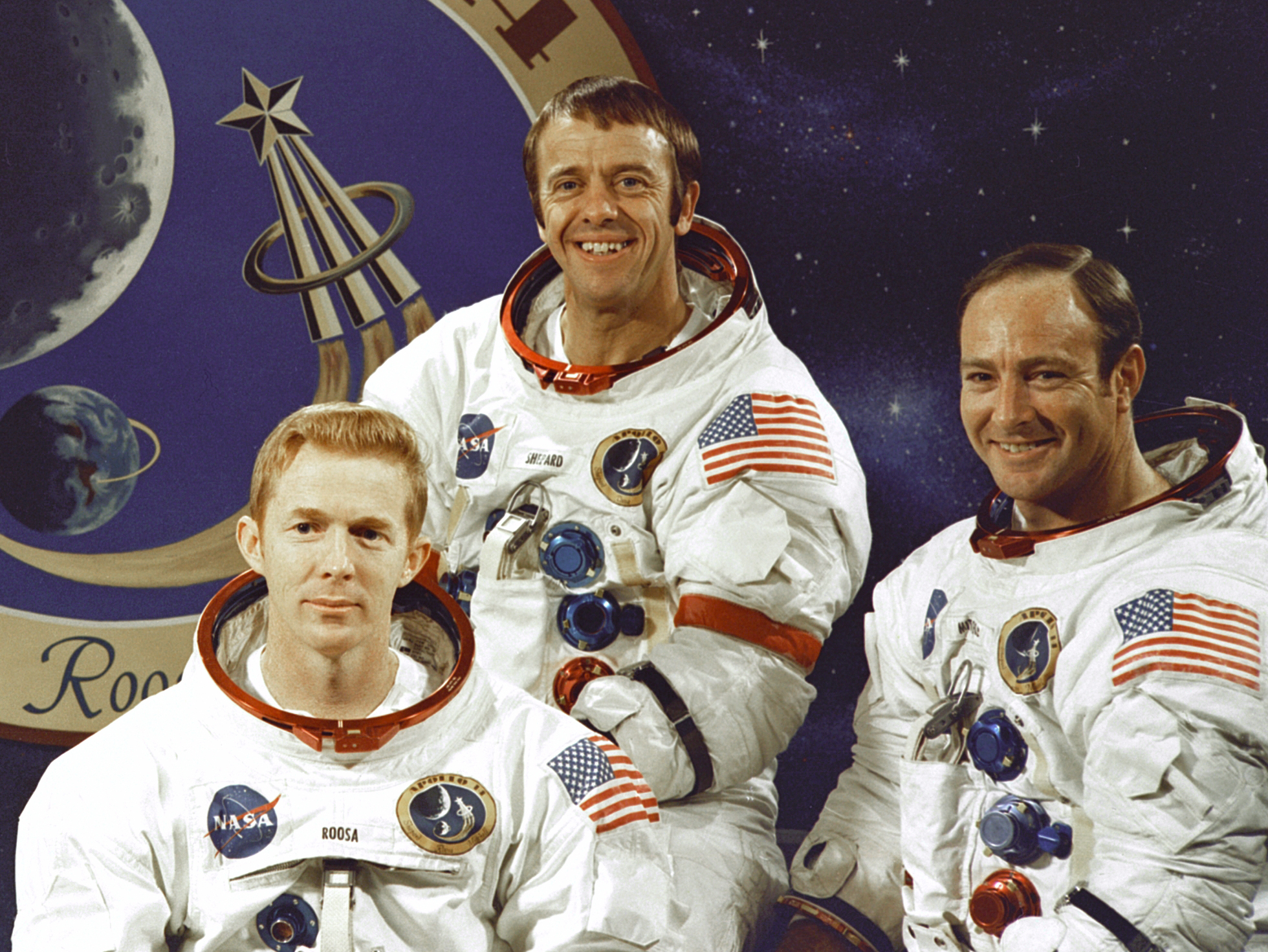
- Stuart Roosa, Alan Shepard, Edgar Mitchell Apollo program

Apollo 14 (January 31 – February 9, 1971) was the eighth crewed mission in the United States Apollo program operated by NASA, the third to land on the Moon, and the first to land in the lunar highlands. It was the last of the "H missions", landings at specific sites of scientific interest on the Moon for two-day stays with two lunar extravehicular activities (EVAs or moonwalks).

The mission was originally scheduled for 1970, but was postponed because of the investigation following the failure of Apollo 13 to reach the Moon's surface, and the need for modifications to the spacecraft as a result. Commander Alan Shepard, Command Module Pilot Stuart Roosa, and Lunar Module Pilot Edgar Mitchell launched on their nine-day mission on Sunday, January 31, 1971, at 4:03:02 p.m. EST. En route to the lunar landing, the crew overcame malfunctions that might have resulted in a second consecutive aborted mission, and possibly, the premature end of the Apollo program.

Shepard and Mitchell made their lunar landing on February 5 in the Fra Mauro formation – originally the target of Apollo 13. During the two walks on the surface, they collected 94.35 pounds (42.80 kg) of Moon rocks and deployed several scientific experiments. To the dismay of some geologists, Shepard and Mitchell did not reach the rim of Cone crater as had been planned, though they came close. In Apollo 14's most famous event, Shepard hit two golf balls he had brought with him with a makeshift club.

While Shepard and Mitchell were on the surface, Roosa remained in lunar orbit aboard the Command and Service Module, performing scientific experiments and photographing the Moon, including the landing site of the future Apollo 16 mission. He took several hundred seeds on the mission, many of which were germinated on return, resulting in the so-called Moon trees, that were widely distributed in the following years. After liftoff from the lunar surface and a successful docking, the spacecraft was flown back to Earth where the three astronauts splashed down safely in the Pacific Ocean on February 9.

== Astronauts and key Mission Control personnel ==
Position	Astronaut
Commander	Alan B. Shepard Jr. Second and last spaceflight
Command Module Pilot	Stuart A. Roosa; Only spaceflight
Lunar Module Pilot	Edgar D. Mitchell; Only spaceflight

The mission commander of Apollo 14, Alan Shepard, one of the original Mercury Seven astronauts, became the first American to enter space with a suborbital flight on May 5, 1961. Thereafter, he was grounded by Ménière's disease, a disorder of the ear, and served as Chief Astronaut, the administrative head of the Astronaut Office. He had experimental surgery in 1968 which was successful and allowed his return to flight status. Shepard, at age 47, was the oldest U.S. astronaut to fly when he made his trip aboard Apollo 14, and he is the oldest person to walk on the Moon.

Apollo 14's Command Module Pilot (CMP), Stuart Roosa, aged 37 when the mission flew, had been a smoke jumper before joining the Air Force in 1953. He became a fighter pilot and then in 1965 successfully completed Aerospace Research Pilot School (ARPS) at Edwards Air Force Base in California prior to his selection as a Group 5 astronaut the following year. He served as a capsule communicator (CAPCOM) for Apollo 9. The Lunar Module Pilot (LMP), Edgar Mitchell, aged 40 at the time of Apollo 14, joined the Navy in 1952 and served as a fighter pilot, beginning in 1954. He was assigned to squadrons aboard aircraft carriers before returning to the United States to further his education while in the Navy, also completing the ARPS prior to his selection as a Group 5 astronaut. He served on the support crew for Apollo 9 and was the LMP of the backup crew for Apollo 10.

Shepard and his crew had originally been designated by Deke Slayton, Director of Flight Crew Operations and one of the Mercury Seven, as the crew for Apollo 13. NASA's management felt that Shepard needed more time for training given he had not flown in space since 1961, and chose him and his crew for Apollo 14 instead. The crew originally designated for Apollo 14, Jim Lovell as the commander, Ken Mattingly as CMP and Fred Haise as LMP, all of whom had backed up Apollo 11, was made the prime crew for Apollo 13 instead.

Mitchell's commander on the Apollo 10 backup crew had been another of the original seven, Gordon Cooper, who had tentatively been scheduled to command Apollo 13, but according to author Andrew Chaikin, his casual attitude toward training resulted in him being not selected. Also on that crew, but excluded from further flights, was Donn Eisele, likely because of problems aboard Apollo 7, which he had flown, and because he had been involved in a messy divorce.

Apollo 14's backup crew was Eugene A. Cernan as commander, Ronald E. Evans Jr. as CMP and Joe H. Engle as LMP. The backup crew, with Harrison Schmitt replacing Engle, would become the prime crew of Apollo 17. Schmitt flew instead of Engle because there was intense pressure on NASA to fly a scientist to the Moon (Schmitt was a geologist) and Apollo 17 was the last lunar flight. Engle, who had flown the X-15 to the edge of outer space, flew into space for NASA in 1981 on STS-2, the second Space Shuttle flight.

During projects Mercury and Gemini, each mission had a prime and a backup crew. Apollo 9 commander James McDivitt believed meetings that required a member of the flight crew were being missed, so for Apollo a third crew of astronauts was added, known as the support crew. Usually low in seniority, support crew members assembled the mission's rules, flight plan, and checklists, and kept them updated; for Apollo 14, they were Philip K. Chapman, Bruce McCandless II, William R. Pogue and C. Gordon Fullerton. CAPCOMs, the individuals in Mission Control responsible for communications with the astronauts were Evans, McCandless, Fullerton and Haise. A veteran of Apollo 13, which had aborted before reaching the Moon, Haise put his training for that mission to use, especially during the EVAs, since both missions were targeted at the same place on the Moon. Had Haise walked on the Moon, he would have been the first Group 5 astronaut to do so, an honor that went to Mitchell.

The flight directors during Apollo had a one-sentence job description, "The flight director may take any actions necessary for crew safety and mission success." For Apollo 14, they were: Pete Frank, Orange team; Glynn Lunney, Black team; Milt Windler, Maroon team and Gerry Griffin, Gold team.

== Preparation and training ==
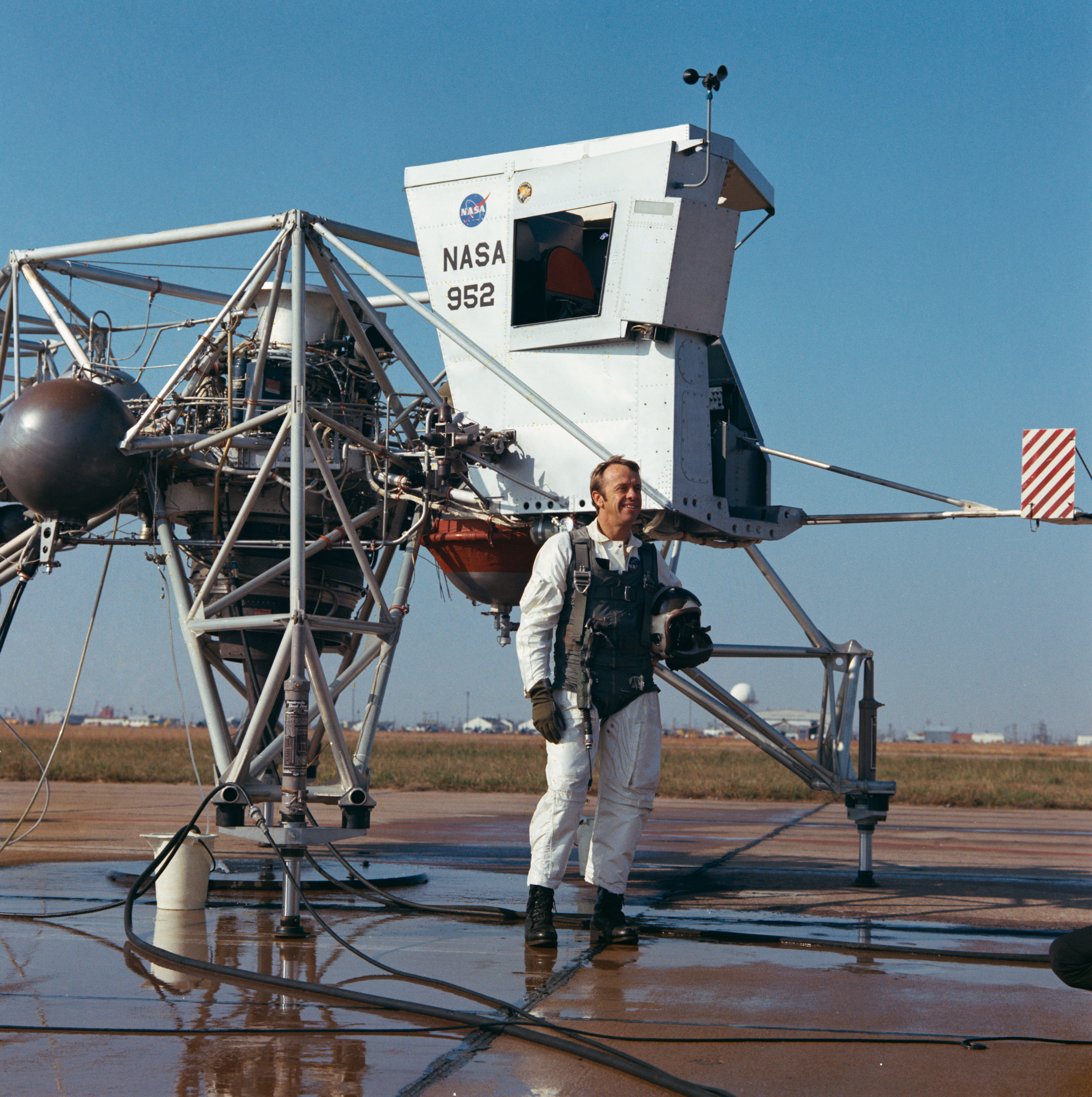
Shepard in front of the Lunar Landing Research Vehicle, flown to simulate the landing

Prime and backup crews for both Apollo 13 and 14 were announced on August 6, 1969. Apollo 14 was scheduled for July 1970, but in January of that year, due to budget cuts that saw the cancellation of Apollo 20, NASA decided there would be two Apollo missions per year with 1970 to see Apollo 13 in April and Apollo 14 likely in October or November.

The investigation into the accident which caused an abort of Apollo 13 delayed Apollo 14. On May 7, 1970, NASA Administrator Thomas O. Paine announced that Apollo 14 would launch no earlier than December 3, and the landing would be close to the site targeted by Apollo 13. The Apollo 14 astronauts continued their training. On June 30, 1970, following the release of the accident report and a NASA review of what changes to the spacecraft would be necessary, NASA announced that the launch would slip to no earlier than January 31, 1971.

The crew of Apollo 14 trained together for 19 months after assignment to the mission, longer than any other Apollo crew to that point. In addition to the normal training workload, they had to supervise the changes to the command and service module (CSM) made as a result of the Apollo 13 investigation, much of which was delegated by Shepard to Roosa. Mitchell later stated, "We realized that if our mission failed—if we had to turn back—that was probably the end of the Apollo program. There was no way NASA could stand two failures in a row. We figured there was a heavy mantle on our shoulders to make sure we got it right."

Before the abort of the Apollo 13 mission, the plan was to have Apollo 14 land near Littrow crater, in Mare Serenitatis, where there are features that were thought to be volcanic. After Apollo 13 returned, it was decided that its landing site, near Cone crater in the Fra Mauro formation, was scientifically more important than Littrow. The Fra Mauro formation is composed of ejecta from the impact event that formed Mare Imbrium, and scientists hoped for samples that originated deep under the Moon's surface. Cone crater was the result of a young, deep impact, and large enough to have torn through whatever debris was deposited since the Imbrium Event, which geologists hoped to be able to date. Landing at Fra Mauro would also allow orbital photography of another candidate landing site, the Descartes Highlands, which became the landing site for Apollo 16. Although Littrow went unvisited, a nearby area, Taurus-Littrow, was the landing site for Apollo 17. Apollo 14's landing site was located slightly closer to Cone crater than the point designated for Apollo 13.

The change in landing site from Littrow to Fra Mauro affected the geological training for Apollo 14. Before the switch, the astronauts had been taken to volcanic sites on Earth; afterwards, they visited crater sites, such as the Ries Crater in West Germany and an artificial crater field created for astronaut training in Arizona's Verde Valley. The effectiveness of the training was limited by a lack of enthusiasm shown by Shepard, which set the tone for Mitchell. Harrison Schmitt suggested that the commander had other things on his mind, such as overcoming a ten-year absence from spaceflight and ensuring a successful mission after the near-disaster of Apollo 13.

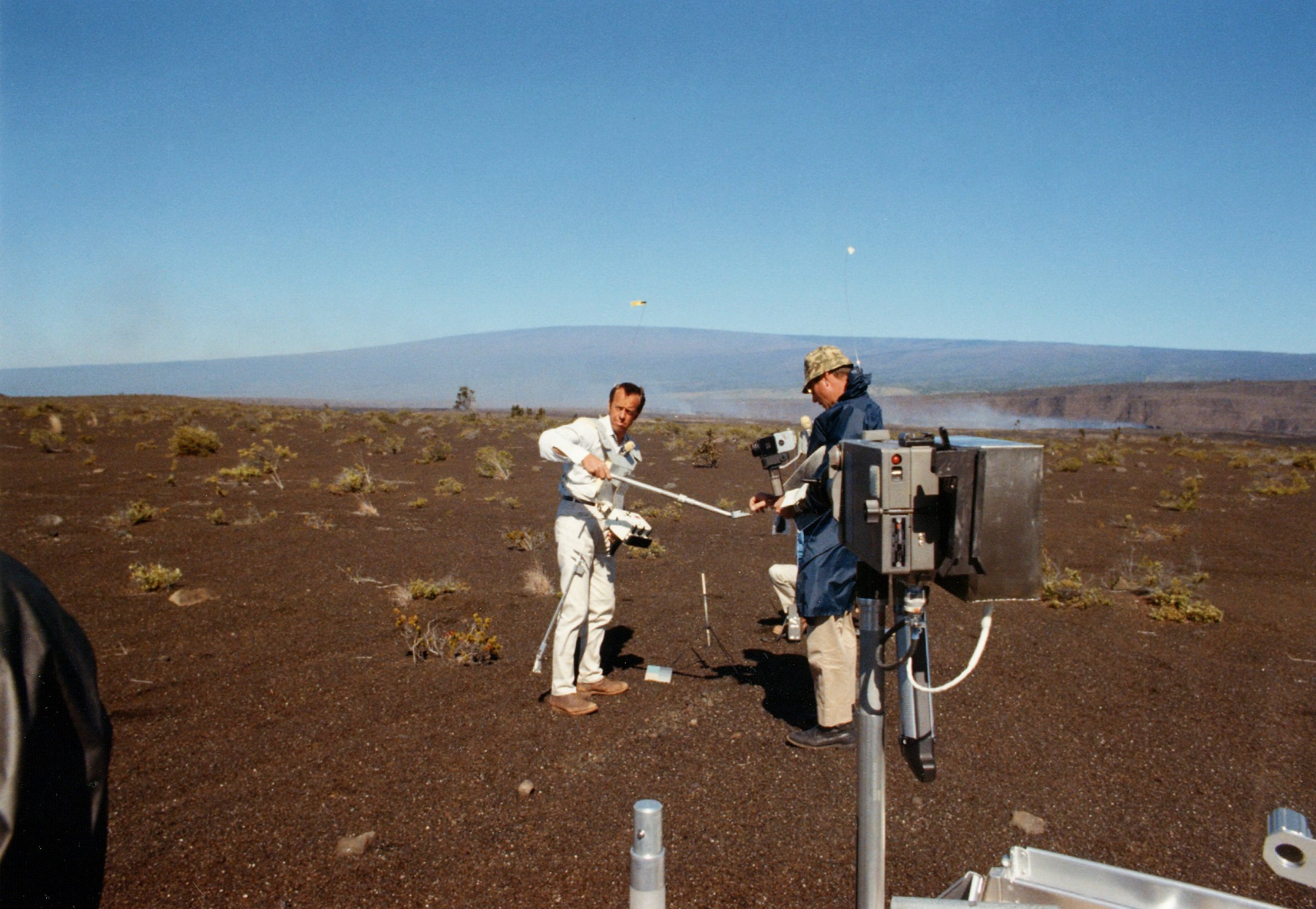
Shepard (left) and Mitchell during geological training

Roosa undertook training for his period alone in lunar orbit, when he would make observations of the Moon and take photographs. He had been impressed by the training given to Apollo 13 prime crew CMP Mattingly by geologist Farouk El-Baz and got El-Baz to agree to undertake his training. The two men pored over lunar maps depicting the areas the CSM would pass over. When Shepard and Mitchell were on their geology field trips, Roosa would be overhead in an airplane taking photographs of the site and making observations. El-Baz had Roosa make observations while flying his T-38 jet at a speed and altitude simulating the speed at which the lunar surface would pass below the CSM.

Another issue that had marked Apollo 13 was the last-minute change of crew due to exposure to communicable disease. To prevent another such occurrence, for Apollo 14 NASA instituted what was called the Flight Crew Health Stabilization Program. Beginning 21 days before launch, the crew lived in quarters at the launch site, Florida's Kennedy Space Center (KSC), with their contacts limited to their spouses, the backup crew, mission technicians, and others directly involved in training. Those individuals were given physical examinations and immunizations, and crew movements were limited as much as possible at KSC and nearby areas.

The Command and Service Modules were delivered to KSC on November 19, 1969; the ascent stage of the LM arrived on November 21 with the descent stage three days later. Thereafter, checkout, testing and equipment installation proceeded. The launch vehicle stack, with the spacecraft on top, was rolled out from the Vehicle Assembly Building to Pad 39A on November 9, 1970.

== Hardware ==
=== Spacecraft ===
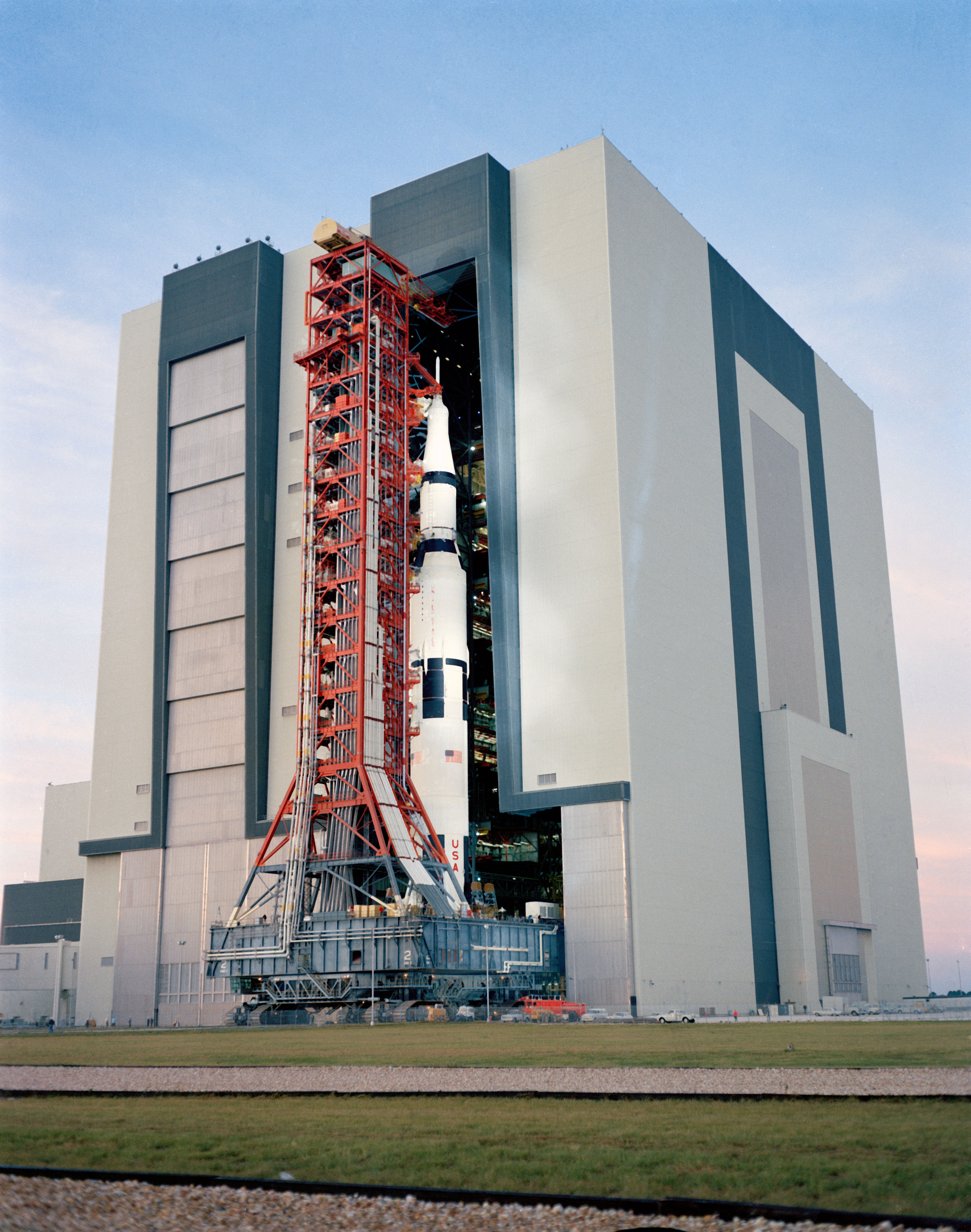
The Apollo 14 launch vehicle is rolled out from the Vehicle Assembly Building, November 9, 1970.

The Apollo 14 spacecraft consisted of Command Module (CM) 110 and Service Module (SM) 110 (together CSM-110), called Kitty Hawk, and Lunar Module 8 (LM-8), called Antares. Roosa had chosen the CSM's call sign after the town in North Carolina where, in 1903, the Wright Brothers first flew their Wright Flyer airplane (also known as Kitty Hawk). Antares was named by Mitchell after the star in the constellation Scorpius that the astronauts in the LM would use to orient the craft for its lunar landing. Also considered part of the spacecraft were a Launch Escape System and a Spacecraft/Launch Vehicle Adapter, numbered SLA-17.

The changes to the Apollo spacecraft between Apollo 13 and 14 were more numerous than with earlier missions, not only because of the problems with Apollo 13, but because of the more extensive lunar activities planned for Apollo 14. The Apollo 13 accident had been caused by the explosive failure of an oxygen tank, after the insulation of the internal wiring had been damaged by heating of the tank contents pre-launch—that the oxygen had gotten hot enough to damage the insulation had not been realized, since the protective thermostatic switches had failed because they were, through an error, not designed to handle the voltage applied during ground testing. The explosion damaged the other tank or its tubing, causing its contents to leak away.

The changes in response included a redesign of the oxygen tanks, with the thermostats being upgraded to handle the proper voltage. A third tank was also added, placed in Bay 1 of the SM, on the side opposite the other two, and was given a valve that could isolate it in an emergency, and allow it to feed the CM's environmental system only. The quantity probe in each tank was upgraded from aluminum to stainless steel.

Also in response to the Apollo 13 accident, the electrical wiring in Bay 4 (where the explosion had happened) was sheathed in stainless steel. The fuel cell oxygen supply valves were redesigned to isolate the Teflon-coated wiring from the oxygen. The spacecraft and Mission Control monitoring systems were modified to give more immediate and visible warnings of anomalies. The Apollo 13 astronauts had suffered shortages of water and of power after the accident. Accordingly, an emergency supply of 5 US gallons (19 L; 4.2 imp gal) of water was stored in Apollo 14's CM, and an emergency battery, identical to those that powered the LM's descent stage, was placed in the SM. The LM was modified to make the transfer of power from LM to CM easier.

Other changes included the installation of anti-slosh baffles in the LM descent stage's propellant tanks. This would prevent the low fuel light from coming on prematurely, as had happened on Apollo 11 and 12. Structural changes were made to accommodate the equipment to be used on the lunar surface, including the Modular Equipment Transporter.

=== Launch vehicle ===
The Saturn V used for Apollo 14 was designated SA-509, and was similar to those used on Apollo 8 through 13. At 6,505,548 pounds (2,950,867 kg), it was the heaviest vehicle yet flown by NASA, 3,814 pounds (1,730 kg) heavier than the launch vehicle for Apollo 13.

A number of changes were made to avoid pogo oscillations, that had caused an early shutdown of the center J-2 engine on Apollo 13's S-II second stage. These included a helium gas accumulator installed in the liquid oxygen (LOX) line of the center engine, a backup cutoff device for that engine, and a simplified 2-position propellant utilization valve on each of the five J-2 engines.

=== ALSEP and other lunar surface equipment ===
The Apollo Lunar Surface Experiments Package (ALSEP) array of scientific instruments carried by Apollo 14 consisted of the Passive Seismic Experiment (PSE), Active Seismic Experiment (ASE), Suprathermal Ion Detector Experiment (SIDE), Cold Cathode Ion Gauge Experiment (CCIG), and Charged Particle Lunar Environment Experiment (CPLEE). Two additional lunar surface experiments not part of the ALSEP were also flown, the Laser Ranging Retroreflector (LRRR or LR3), to be deployed in the ALSEP's vicinity, and the Lunar Portable Magnetometer (LPM), to be used by the astronauts during their second EVA. The PSE had been flown on Apollo 12 and 13, the ASE on Apollo 13, the SIDE on Apollo 12, the CCIG on Apollo 12 and 13, and the LRRR on Apollo 11. The LPM was new, but resembled equipment flown on Apollo 12. The ALSEP components flown on Apollo 13 were destroyed when its LM burned up in Earth's atmosphere. Deployment of the ALSEP, and of the other instruments, each formed one of Apollo 14's mission objectives.

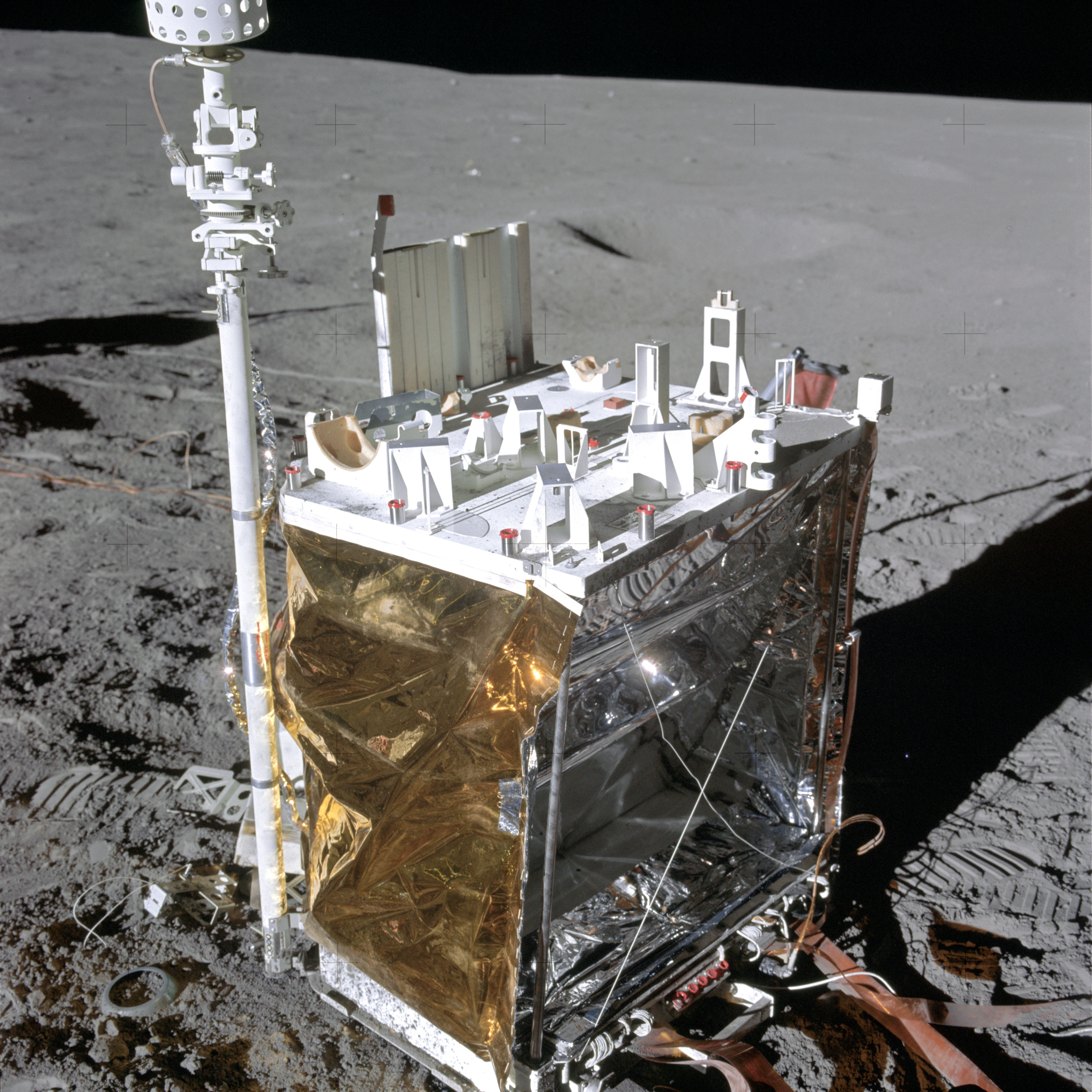
A close-up view of the Apollo 14 ALSEP Central Station deployed on the Moon

The PSE was a seismometer, similar to one left on the Moon by Apollo 12, and was to measure seismic activity in the Moon. The Apollo 14 instrument would be calibrated by the impact, after being jettisoned, of the LM's ascent stage, since an object of known mass and velocity would be impacting at a known location on the Moon. The Apollo 12 instrument would also be activated by the spent Apollo 14 S-IVB booster, which would impact the Moon after the mission entered lunar orbit. The two seismometers would, in combination with those left by later Apollo missions, constitute a network of such instruments at different locations on the Moon.

The ASE would also measure seismic waves. It consisted of two parts. In the first, one of the crew members would deploy three geophones at distances up to 310 feet (94 m) from the ALSEP's Central Station, and on his way back from the furthest, fire thumpers every 15 feet (4.6 m). The second consisted of four mortars (with their launch tubes), of different properties and set to impact at different distances from the experiment. It was hoped that the waves generated from the impacts would provide data about seismic wave transmission in the Moon's regolith. The mortar shells were not to be fired until the astronauts had returned to Earth, and in the event were never fired for fear they would damage other experiments. A similar experiment was successfully deployed, and the mortars launched, on Apollo 16.

The LPM was to be carried during the second EVA and used to measure the Moon's magnetic field at various points. The SIDE measured ions on the lunar surface, including from the solar wind. It was combined with the CCIG, which was to measure the lunar atmosphere and detect if it varied over time. The CPLEE measured the particle energies of protons and electrons generated by the Sun that reached the lunar surface. The LRRR acts as a passive target for laser beams, allowing the measurement of the Earth/Moon distance and how it changes over time. The LRRRs from Apollo 11, 14 and 15 are the only experiments left on the Moon by the Apollo astronauts that are still returning data.

Flown for the first time on Apollo 14 was the Buddy Secondary Life Support System (BSLSS), a set of flexible hoses that would enable Shepard and Mitchell to share cooling water should one of their Primary Life Support System (PLSS) backpacks fail. In such an emergency, the astronaut with the failed equipment would get oxygen from his Oxygen Purge System (OPS) backup cylinder, but the BSLSS would ensure he did not have to use oxygen for cooling, extending the life of the OPS. The OPSs used on Apollo 14 were modified from those used on previous missions in that the internal heaters were removed as unnecessary.

Water bags were also taken to the lunar surface, dubbed "Gunga Dins", for insertion in the astronauts' helmets, allowing them sips of water during the EVAs. These had been flown on Apollo 13, but Shepard and Mitchell were the first to use them on the Moon. Similarly, Shepard was the first on the lunar surface to wear a spacesuit with commander's stripes: red stripes on arms, legs, and on the helmet, though one had been worn by Lovell on Apollo 13. These were instituted because of the difficulty in telling one spacesuited astronaut from the other in photographs.

=== Modular Equipment Transporter ===
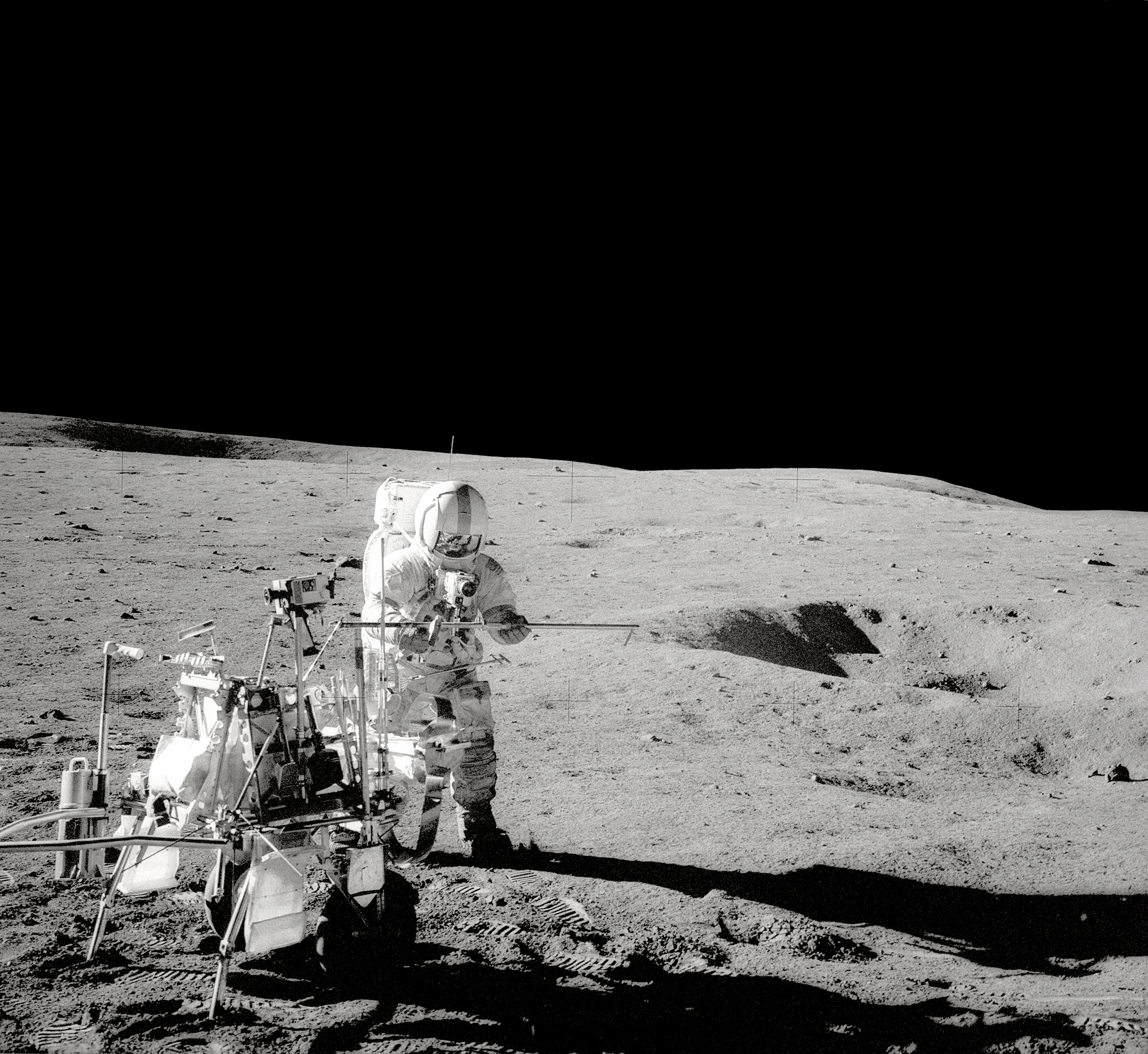
Shepard and the Modular Equipment Transporter

The Modular Equipment Transporter (MET) was a two-wheeled handcart, used only on Apollo 14, intended to allow the astronauts to take tools and equipment with them, and store lunar samples, without needing to carry them. On later Apollo program missions, the self-propelled Lunar Roving Vehicle (LRV) was flown instead.

The MET, when deployed for use on the lunar surface, was about 86 inches (220 cm) long, 39 inches (99 cm) wide and 32 inches (81 cm) high. It had pressurized rubber tires 4 inches (10 cm) wide and 16 inches (41 cm) in diameter, containing nitrogen and inflated to about 1.5 pounds per square inch (10 kPa). The first use of tires on the Moon, these were developed by Goodyear and were dubbed their XLT (Experimental Lunar Tire) model. Fully loaded, the MET weighed about 165 pounds (75 kg). Two legs combined with the wheels to provide four-point stability when at rest.

== Mission highlights ==
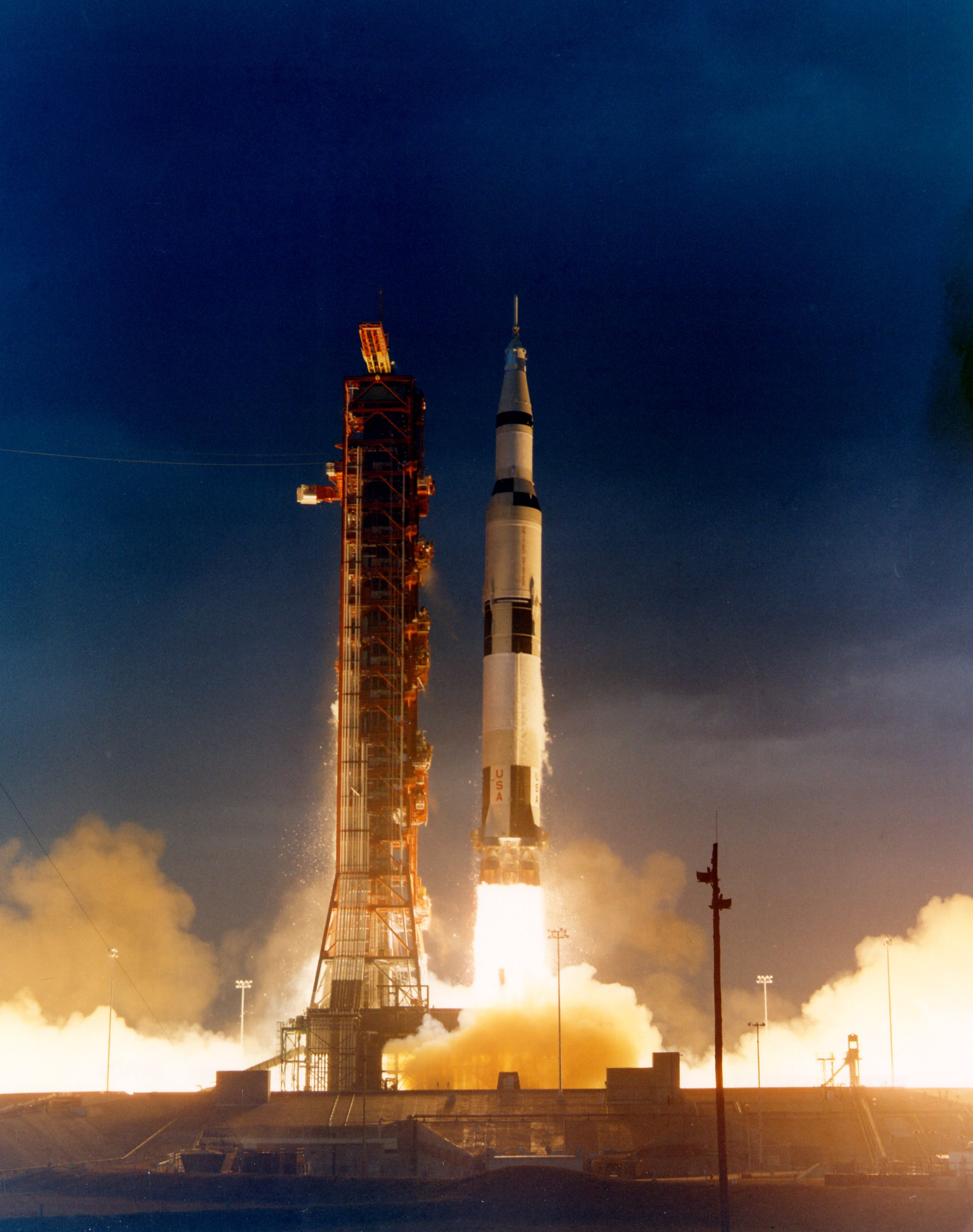
Launch of Apollo 14

=== Launch and flight to lunar orbit ===
Apollo 14 launched from Launch Complex 39-A at KSC at 4:03:02 pm (21:03:02 UTC), January 31, 1971. This followed a launch delay due to weather of 40 minutes and 2 seconds; the first such delay in the Apollo program. The original planned time, 3:23 pm, was at the very start of the launch window of just under four hours; had Apollo 14 not launched during it, it could not have departed until March. Apollo 12 had launched during poor weather and twice been struck by lightning, as a result of which the rules had been tightened. Among those present to watch the launch were U.S. Vice President Spiro T. Agnew and the Prince of Spain, the future King Juan Carlos I. The mission would take a faster trajectory to the Moon than planned, and thus make up the time in flight. Because it had, just over two days after launch, the mission timers would be put ahead by 40 minutes and 3 seconds so that later events would take place at the times scheduled in the flight plan.

After the vehicle reached orbit, the S-IVB third stage shut down, and the astronauts performed checks of the spacecraft before restarting the stage for translunar injection (TLI), the burn that placed the vehicle on course for the Moon. After TLI, the CSM separated from the S-IVB, and Roosa performed the transposition maneuver, turning it around in order to dock with the LM before the entire spacecraft separated from the stage. Roosa, who had practiced the maneuver many times, hoped to break the record for the least amount of propellant used in docking. But when he gently brought the modules together, the docking mechanism would not activate. He made several attempts over the next two hours, as mission controllers huddled and sent advice. If the LM could not be extracted from its place on the S-IVB, no lunar landing could take place, and with consecutive failures, the Apollo program might end. Mission Control proposed that they try it again with the docking probe retracted, hoping the contact would trigger the latches. This worked, and within an hour the joined spacecraft had separated from the S-IVB. The stage was set on a course to impact the Moon, which it did just over three days later, causing the Apollo 12 seismometer to register vibrations for over three hours.

The crew settled in for its voyage to Fra Mauro. At 60:30 Ground Elapsed Time, Shepard and Mitchell entered the LM to check its systems; while there they photographed a wastewater dump from the CSM, part of a particle contamination study in preparation for Skylab. Two midcourse corrections were performed on the translunar coast, with one burn lasting 10.19 seconds and one lasting 0.65 seconds.

=== Lunar orbit and descent ===
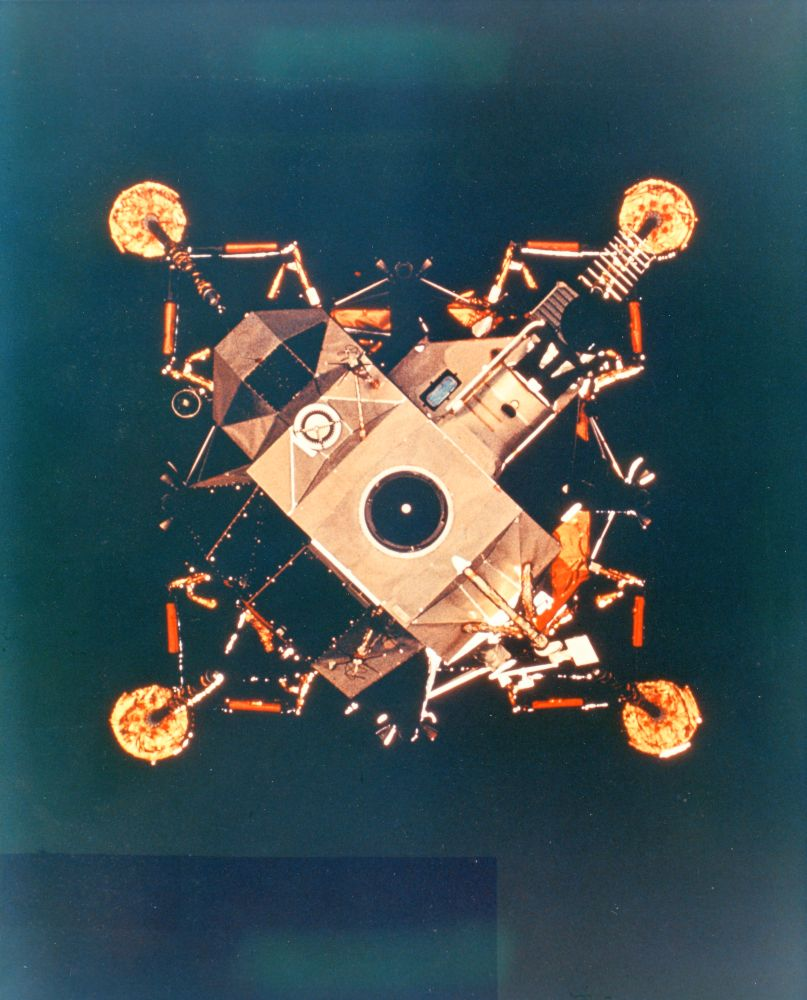
Antares as seen from Kitty Hawk

At 81:56:40.70 into the mission (February 4 at 1:59:43 am EST; 06:59:43 UTC), the Service Propulsion System engine in the SM was fired for 370.84 seconds to send the craft into a lunar orbit with apocynthion of 169 nautical miles (313 km; 194 mi) and pericynthion of 58.1 nautical miles (107.6 km; 66.9 mi). A second burn, at 86:10:52 mission time, sent the spacecraft into an orbit of 58.8 nautical miles (108.9 km; 67.7 mi) by 9.1 nautical miles (16.9 km; 10.5 mi). This was done in preparation for the release of the LM Antares. Apollo 14 was the first mission on which the CSM propelled the LM to the lower orbit—though Apollo 13 would have done so had the abort not already occurred. This was done to increase the amount of hover time available to the astronauts, a safety factor since Apollo 14 was to land in rough terrain.

After separating from the command module in lunar orbit, the LM Antares had two serious problems. First, the LM computer began getting an ABORT signal from a faulty switch. NASA believed the computer might be getting erroneous readings like this if a tiny ball of solder had shaken loose and was floating between the switch and the contact, closing the circuit. The immediate solution – tapping on the panel next to the switch – did work briefly, but the circuit soon closed again. If the problem recurred after the descent engine fired, the computer would think the signal was real and would initiate an auto-abort, causing the ascent stage to separate from the descent stage and climb back into orbit. NASA and the software teams at the Massachusetts Institute of Technology scrambled to find a solution. The software was hard-wired, preventing it from being updated from the ground. The fix made it appear to the system that an abort had already happened, and it would ignore incoming automated signals to abort. This would not prevent the astronauts from piloting the ship, though if an abort became necessary, they might have to initiate it manually. Mitchell entered the changes with minutes to go until planned ignition.

A second problem occurred during the powered descent, when the LM landing radar failed to lock automatically onto the Moon's surface, depriving the navigation computer of vital information on the vehicle's altitude and vertical descent speed. After the astronauts cycled the landing radar breaker, the unit successfully acquired a signal near 22,000 feet (6,700 m). Mission rules required an abort if the landing radar was out at 10,000 feet (3,000 m), though Shepard might have tried to land without it. With the landing radar, Shepard steered the LM to a landing which was the closest to the intended target of the six missions that landed on the Moon.

=== Lunar surface operations ===
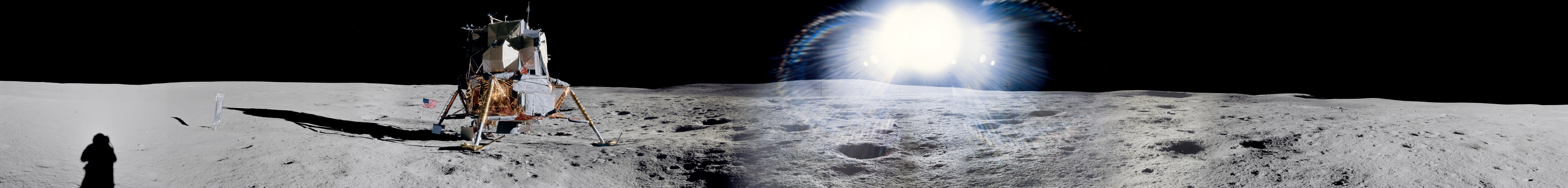
Panorama of the Apollo 14 landing site taken in 1971

Shepard stated, after stepping onto the lunar surface, "And it's been a long way, but we're here." The first EVA began at 9:42 am EST (14:42 UTC) on February 5, 1971, having been delayed by a problem with the communications system which set back the start of the first EVA to five hours after landing. The astronauts devoted much of the first EVA to equipment offloading, deployment of the ALSEP and the US flag, as well as setting up and loading the MET. These activities were televised back to Earth, though the picture tended to degenerate during the latter portion of the EVA. Mitchell deployed the ASE's geophone lines, unreeling and emplacing the two 310 feet (94 m) lines leading out from the ALSEP's Central Station. He then fired the thumper explosives, vibrations from which would give scientists back on Earth information about the depth and composition of the lunar regolith. Of the 21 thumpers, five failed to fire. On the way back to the LM, the astronauts collected and documented lunar samples, and took photographs of the area. The first EVA lasted 4 hours, 47 minutes, 50 seconds.

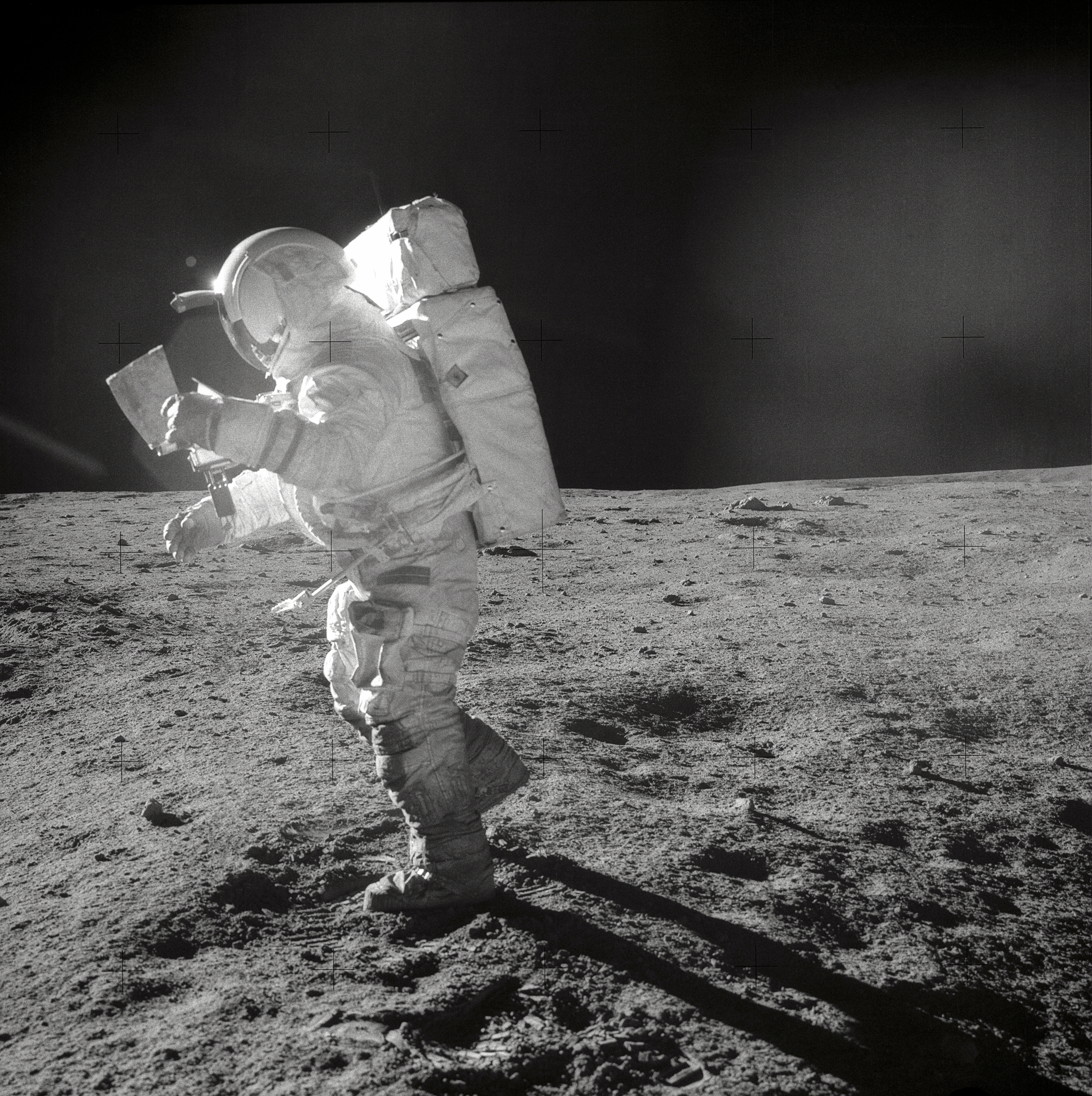
Mitchell studies a map while on the Moon.

The astronauts had been surprised by the undulating ground, expecting flatter terrain in the area of the landing, and this became an issue on the second EVA, as they set out, MET in tow, for the rim of Cone crater. The craters that Shepard and Mitchell planned to use for navigational landmarks looked very different on the ground than on the maps they had, based on overhead shots taken from lunar orbit. Additionally, they consistently overestimated the distance they travelled. Mission Control and the CAPCOM, Fred Haise, could see nothing of this, as the television camera remained near the LM, but they worried as the clock ticked on the EVA, and monitored the heavy breathing and rapid heartbeats of the astronauts. They topped one ridge that they expected was the crater rim, only to view more such terrain beyond. Although Mitchell strongly suspected the rim was nearby, they had become physically exhausted from the effort. They were then instructed by Haise to sample where they were and then start moving back towards the LM. Later analysis using the pictures they took determined that they had come within about 65 feet (20 m) of the crater's rim. Images from the Lunar Reconnaissance Orbiter (LRO) show the tracks of the astronauts and the MET come to within 30 m of the rim. The difficulties faced by Shepard and Mitchell would emphasize the need for a means of transportation on the lunar surface with a navigation system, which was met by the Lunar Roving Vehicle, already planned to fly on Apollo 15.

Once the astronauts returned to the vicinity of the LM and were again within view of the television camera, Shepard performed a stunt he had been planning for years in the event he reached the Moon, and which is probably what Apollo 14 is best remembered for. Shepard brought along a Wilson six iron golf club head, which he had modified to attach to the handle of the contingency sample tool, and two golf balls. Shepard took several one-handed swings (due to the limited flexibility of the EVA suit) and exuberantly exclaimed that the second ball went "miles and miles and miles" in the low lunar gravity. Mitchell then threw a lunar scoop handle as if it were a javelin. The "javelin" and one of the golf balls wound up in a crater together, with Mitchell's projectile a bit further. In an interview with Ottawa Golf, Shepard stated the other landed near the ALSEP. The second EVA lasted 4 hours, 34 minutes, 41 seconds. Shepard brought back the club, gave it to the USGA Museum in New Jersey, and had a replica made which he gave to the National Air and Space Museum. In February 2021, to commemorate Apollo 14's 50th anniversary, imaging specialist Andy Saunders, who had previously worked to produce the clearest image of Neil Armstrong on the Moon, produced new, digitally enhanced images that were used to estimate the final resting places of the two balls that Shepard hit - the first landed approximately 24 yards from the "tee", while the second managed 40 yards.

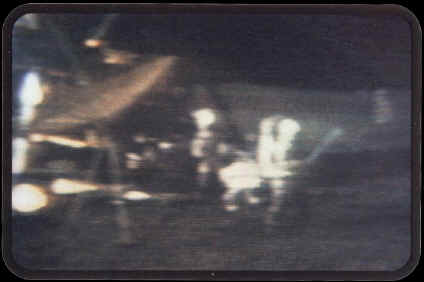
Lunar surface television showing Shepard taking a couple of golf swings

==== Lunar samples ====
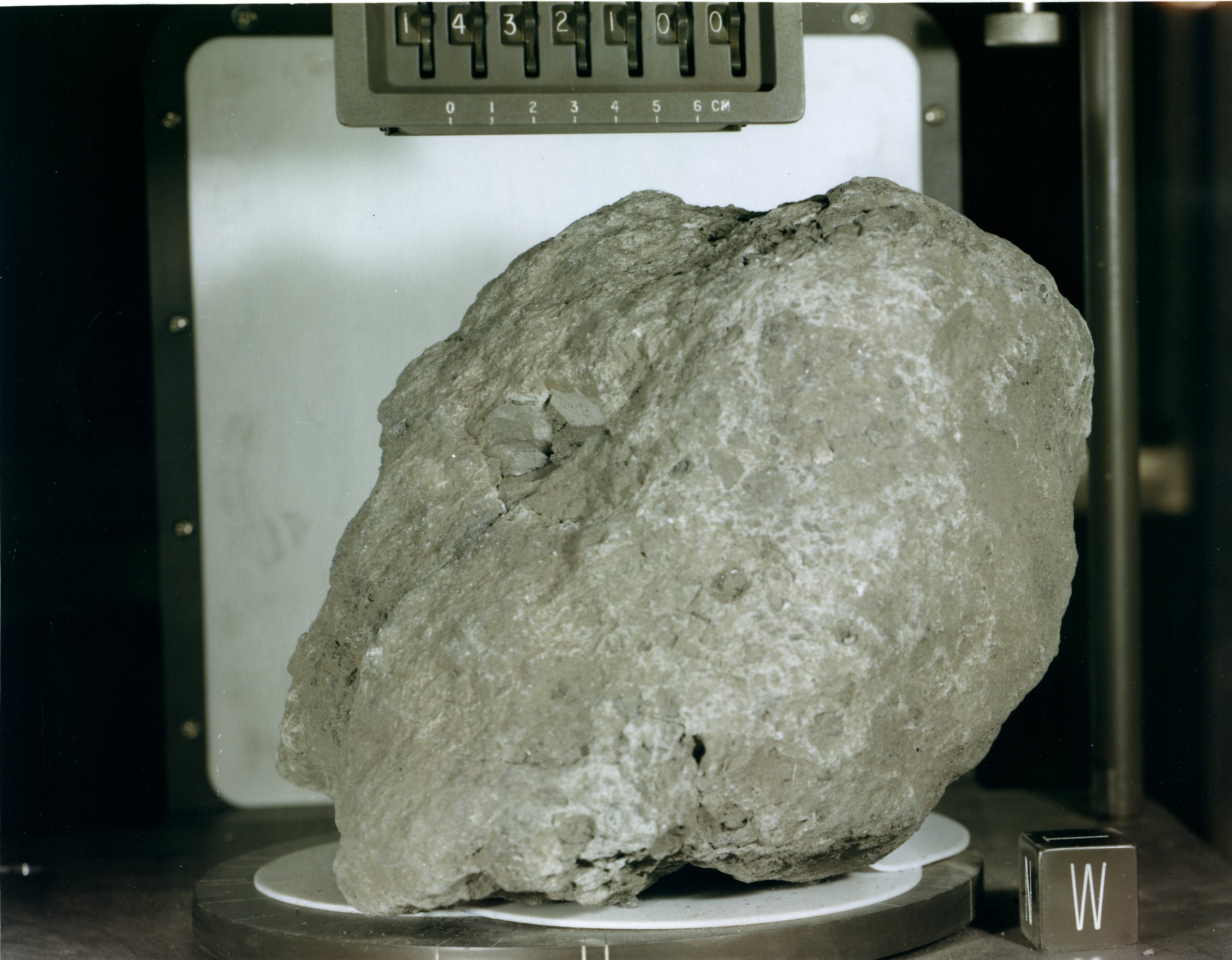
The "Big Bertha" rock (Lunar Sample 14321) was the third largest rock collected during the Apollo program.

A total of 94 pounds (43 kg) of Moon rocks, or lunar samples, were brought back from Apollo 14. Most are breccias, which are rocks composed of fragments of other, older rocks. Breccias form when the heat and pressure of meteorite impacts fuse small rock fragments together. There were a few basalts that were collected in this mission in the form of clasts (fragments) in breccia. The Apollo 14 basalts are generally richer in aluminum and sometimes richer in potassium than other lunar basalts. Most lunar mare basalts collected during the Apollo program were formed from 3.0 to 3.8 billion years ago. The Apollo 14 basalts were formed 4.0 to 4.3 billion years ago, older than the volcanism known to have occurred at any of the mare locations reached during the Apollo program.

Some geologists were pleased enough with the close approach to Cone crater to send a case of scotch to the astronauts while they were in post-mission quarantine, though their enthusiasm was tempered by the fact that Shepard and Mitchell had documented few of the samples they brought back, making it hard and sometimes impossible to discern where they came from. Others were less happy; Don Wilhelms wrote in his book on the geological aspects of Apollo, "the golf game did not set well with most geologists in light of the results at Cone crater. The total haul from the rim-flank of Cone ... was 16 Hasselblad photographs (out of a mission total of 417), six rock-size samples heavier than 50 g, and a grand total of 10 kg of samples, 9 kg of which are in one rock (sample 14321 [i.e., Big Bertha]). That is to say, apart from 14321 we have less than 1 kg of rock—962 g to be exact—from what in my opinion is the most important single point reached by astronauts on the Moon." Geologist Lee Silver stated, "The Apollo 14 crews did not have the right attitude, did not learn enough about their mission, had the burden of not having the best possible preflight photography, and they weren't ready." In their sourcebook on Apollo, Richard W. Orloff and David M. Harland doubted that if Apollo 13 had reached the Moon, Lovell, and Haise, given a more distant landing point, could have got as close to Cone crater as Shepard and Mitchell did.

In January 2019 research showed that Big Bertha, which weighs 19.837 pounds (8.998 kg), has characteristics that make it likely to be a terrestrial (Earth) meteorite. Granite and quartz, which are commonly found on Earth but very rarely found on the Moon, were confirmed to exist on Big Bertha. To find the sample's age, the research team from Curtin University looked at bits of the mineral zircon embedded in its structure. "By determining the age of zircon found in the sample, we were able to pinpoint the age of the host rock at about four billion years old, making it similar to the oldest rocks on Earth," researcher Alexander Nemchin said, adding that "the chemistry of the zircon in this sample is very different from that of every other zircon grain ever analyzed in lunar samples, and remarkably similar to that of zircons found on Earth." This would mean Big Bertha is both the first discovered terrestrial meteorite and the oldest known Earth rock.

=== Lunar orbit operations ===
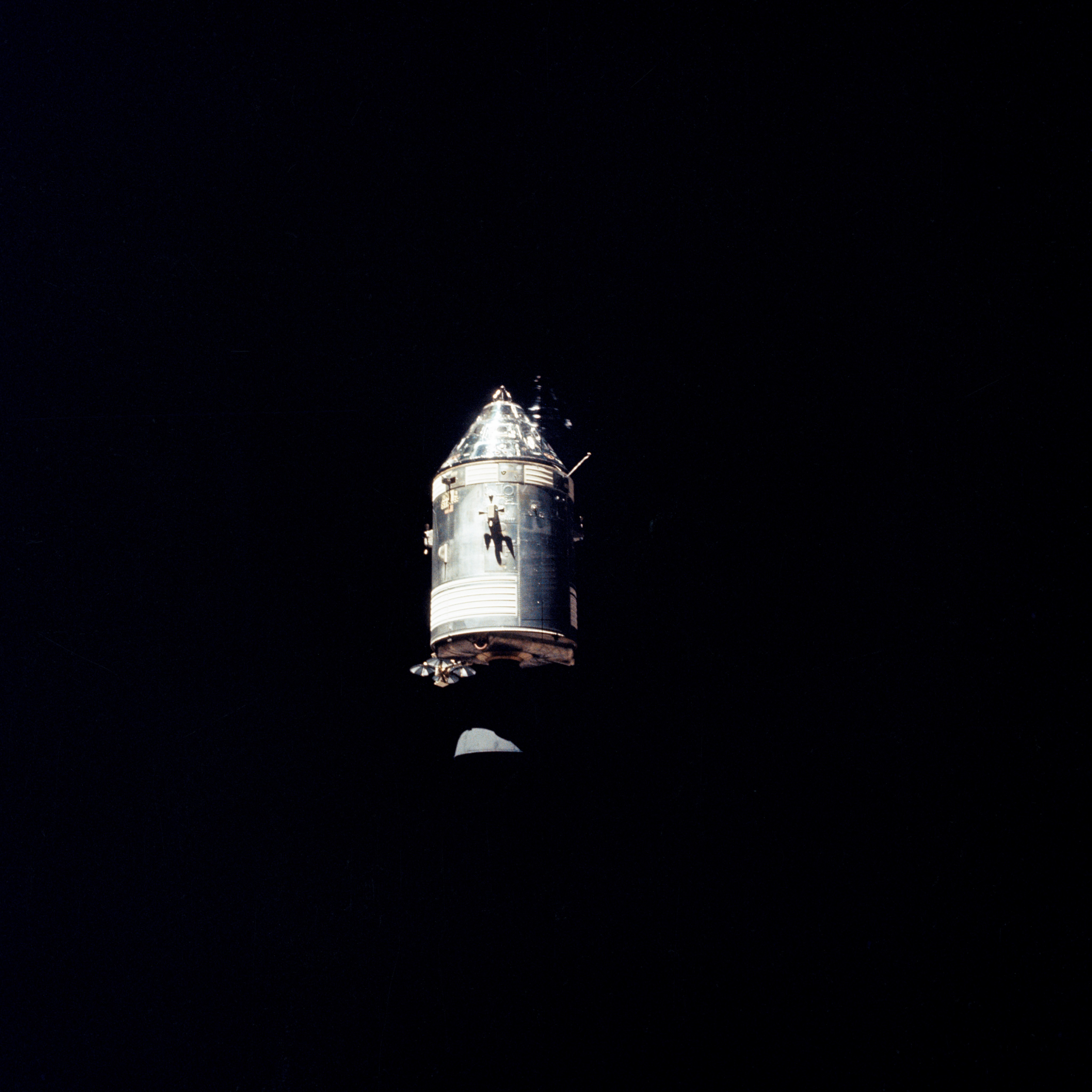
Kitty Hawk in lunar orbit

Roosa spent almost two days alone aboard Kitty Hawk, performing the first intensive program of scientific observation from lunar orbit, much of which was intended to have been done by Apollo 13. After Antares separated and its crew began preparations to land, Roosa in Kitty Hawk performed an SPS burn to send the CSM to an orbit of approximately 60 nautical miles (110 km; 69 mi), and later a plane change maneuver to compensate for the rotation of the Moon.

Roosa took pictures from lunar orbit. The Lunar Topographic Camera, also known as the Hycon camera, was supposed to be used to image the surface, including the Descartes Highlands site being considered for Apollo 16, but it quickly developed a fault with the shutter that Roosa could not fix despite considerable help from Houston. Although about half of the photographic targets had to be scrubbed, Roosa was able to obtain photographs of Descartes with a Hasselblad camera and confirm that it was a suitable landing point. Roosa also used the Hasselblad to take photographs of the impact point of Apollo 13's S-IVB near Lansburg B crater. After the mission, troubleshooting found a tiny piece of aluminum contaminating the shutter control circuit, which caused the shutter to operate continuously.

Roosa was able to see sunlight glinting off Antares and view its lengthy shadow on the lunar surface on Orbit 17; on Orbit 29 he could see the sun reflecting off the ALSEP. He also took astronomical photographs, of the Gegenschein, and of the Lagrangian point of the Sun-Earth system that lies beyond the Earth (L_{2}), testing the theory that the Gegenschein is generated by reflections off particles at L_{2}. Performing the bistatic radar experiment, he also focused Kitty Hawk's VHF and S-band transmitters at the Moon so that they would bounce off and be detected on Earth in an effort to learn more about the depth of the lunar regolith.

=== Return, splashdown and quarantine ===
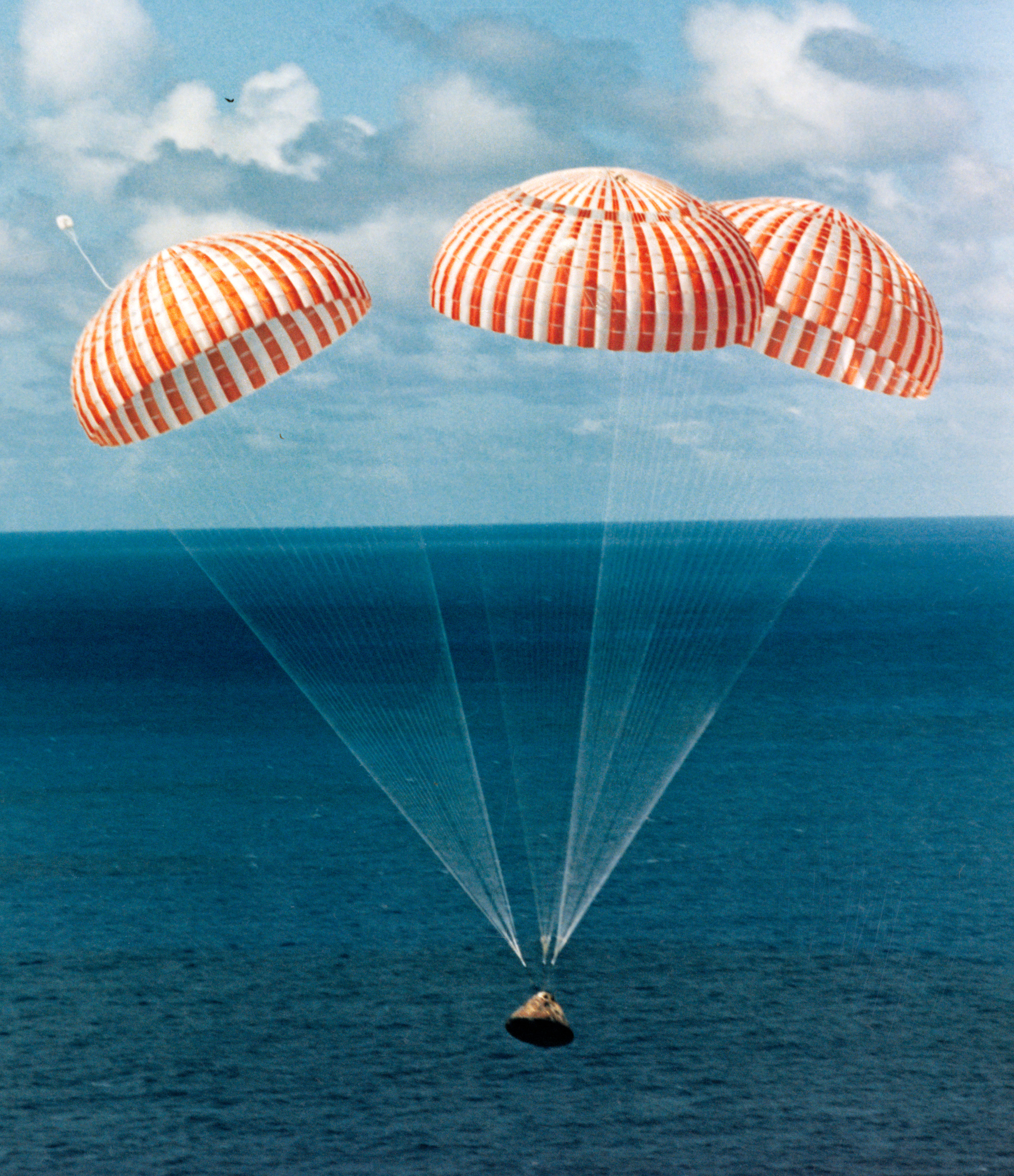
Apollo 14 landing in the South Pacific

Antares lifted off from the Moon at 1:48:42 pm EST (18:48:42 UTC) on February 6, 1971. Following the first direct (first orbit) rendezvous on a lunar landing mission, docking took place an hour and 47 minutes later. Despite concerns based on the docking problems early in the mission, the docking was successful on the first attempt, though the LM's Abort Guidance System, used for navigation, failed just before the two craft docked. After crew, equipment, and lunar samples were transferred to Kitty Hawk, the ascent stage was jettisoned, and impacted the Moon, setting off waves registered by the seismometers from Apollo 12 and 14.

A trans-earth injection burn took place on February 6 at 8:39:04 pm (February 7 at 01:39:04 UTC) taking 350.8 seconds, during Kitty Hawk's 34th lunar revolution. During the trans-earth coast, two tests of the oxygen system were performed, one to ensure the system would operate properly with low densities of oxygen in the tanks, the second to operate the system at a high flow rate, as would be necessary for the in-flight EVAs scheduled for Apollo 15 and later. Additionally, a navigation exercise was done to simulate a return to Earth following a loss of communications. All were successful. During his rest periods on the voyage, Mitchell conducted ESP experiments without NASA's knowledge or sanction, attempting by prearrangement to send images of cards he had brought with him to four people on Earth. He stated after the mission that two of the four had gotten 51 out of 200 correct (the others were less successful), whereas random chance would have dictated 40. On the final evening in space, the crew conducted a press conference, with the questions submitted to NASA in advance and read to the astronauts by the CAPCOM.

The command module Kitty Hawk splashed down in the South Pacific Ocean on February 9, 1971, at 21:05 [UTC], approximately 900 miles (1,400 km) south of American Samoa. After recovery by the ship USS New Orleans, the crew was flown to Pago Pago International Airport in Tafuna, then to Honolulu, then to Ellington Air Force Base near Houston in a plane containing a Mobile Quarantine Facility trailer before they continued their quarantine in the Lunar Receiving Laboratory. They remained there until their release from quarantine on February 27, 1971. The Apollo 14 astronauts were the last lunar explorers to be quarantined on their return from the Moon. They were the only Apollo crew to be quarantined both before and after the flight.

Roosa, who worked in forestry in his youth, took several hundred tree seeds on the flight. These were germinated after the return to Earth, and were widely distributed around the world as commemorative Moon trees. Some seedlings were given to state forestry associations in 1975 and 1976 to mark the United States Bicentennial.

== Mission insignia ==
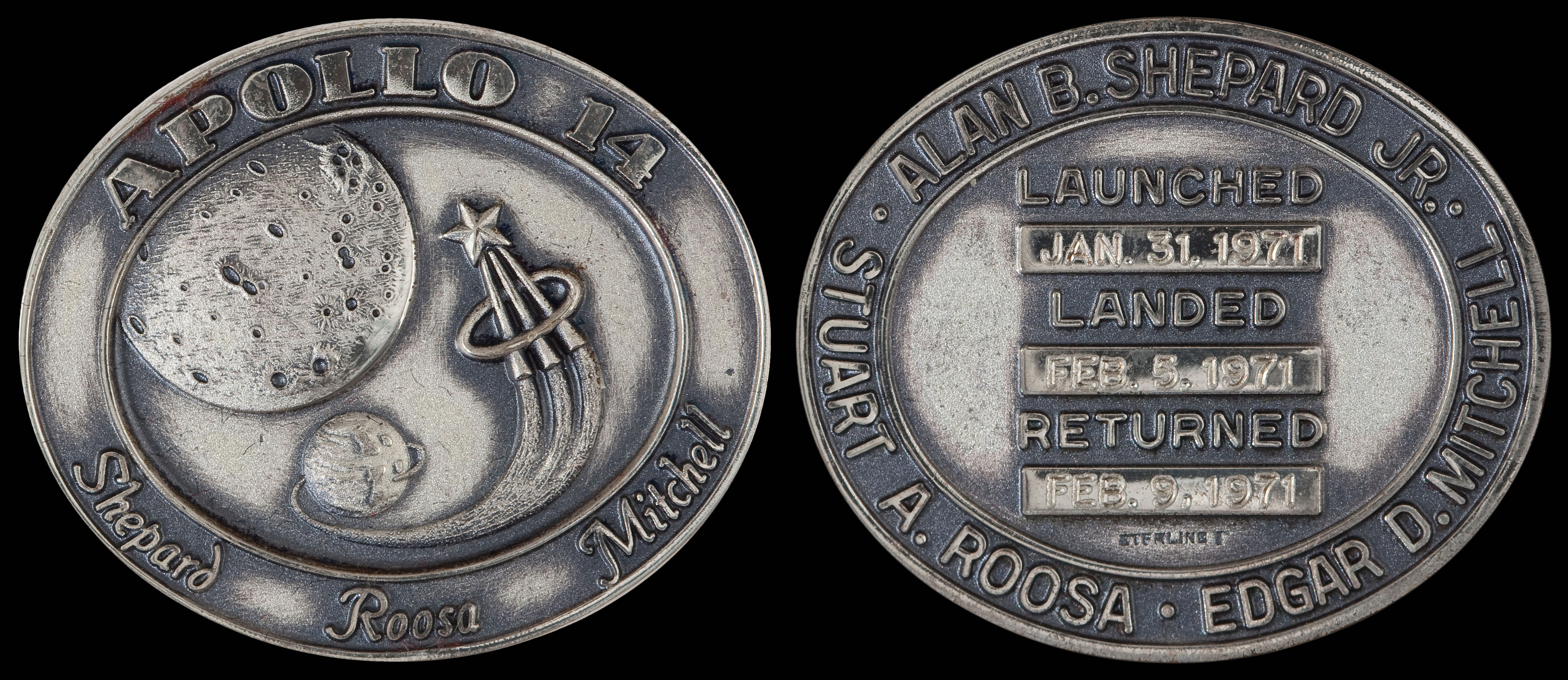
Apollo 14 space-flown silver Robbins medallion

The mission insignia is an oval depicting the Earth and the Moon, and an astronaut pin drawn with a comet trail. The pin is leaving Earth and is approaching the Moon. A gold band around the edge includes the mission and astronaut names. The designer was Jean Beaulieu, who based it on a sketch by Shepard, who had been head of the Astronaut Office and meant the pin to symbolize that through him, the entire corps was in spirit flying to the Moon.

The backup crew spoofed the patch with its own version, with revised artwork showing a Wile E. Coyote cartoon character depicted as gray-bearded (for Shepard, who was 47 at the time of the mission and the oldest man on the Moon), pot-bellied (for Mitchell, who had a pudgy appearance) and red-furred (for Roosa's red hair), still on the way to the Moon, while Road Runner (for the backup crew) is already on the Moon, holding a U.S. flag and a flag labelled "1st Team". The flight name is replaced by "BEEP BEEP" and the backup crew's names are given. Several of these patches were hidden by the backup crew and found during the flight by the crew in notebooks and storage lockers in both the CSM Kitty Hawk and the LM Antares, and one patch was stored in the MET lunar handcart. One patch, attached to Shepard's PLSS, was worn on the lunar surface, and, mounted on a plaque, was presented by him to Cernan after the mission.

== Spacecraft locations ==
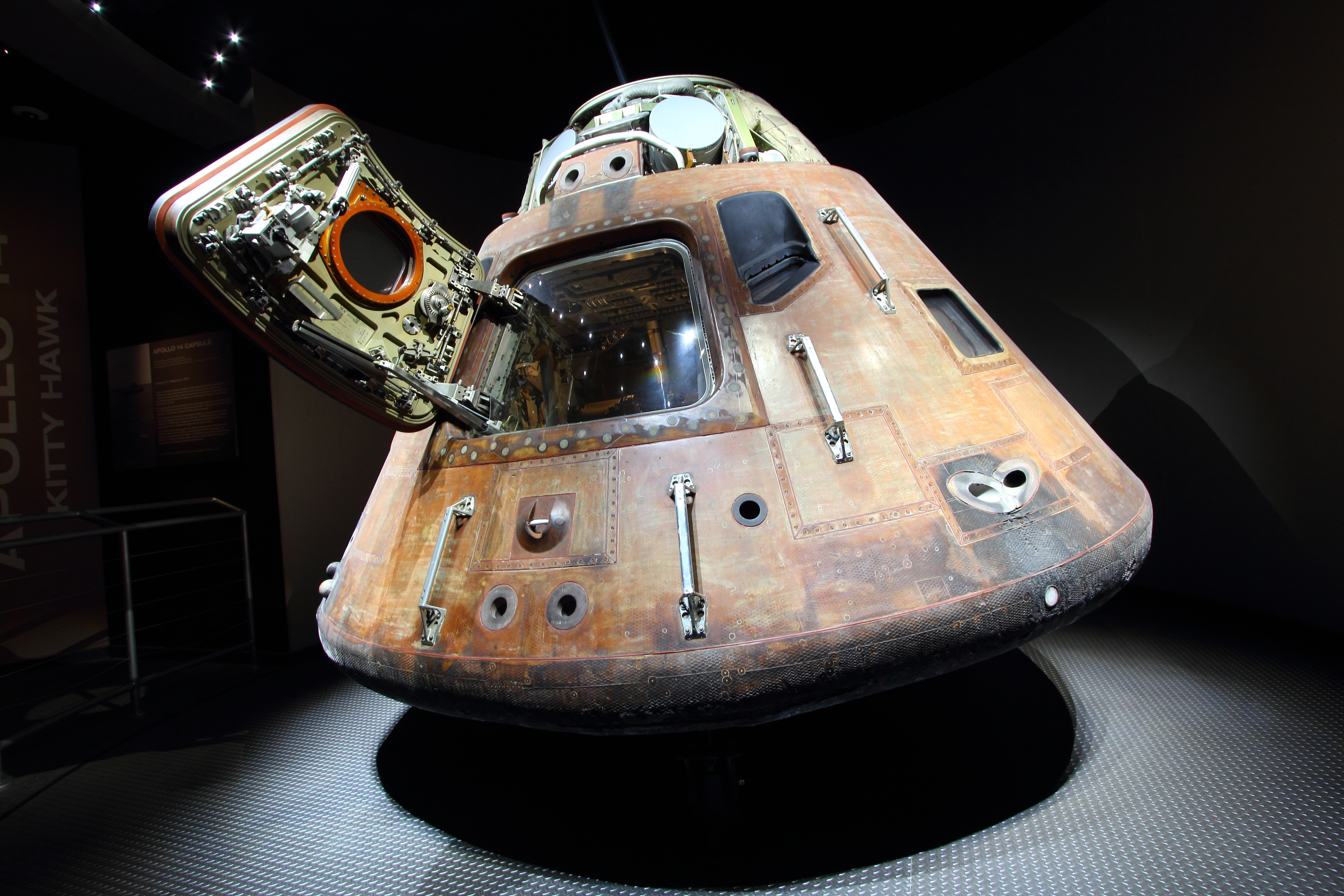
The command module Kitty Hawk at the Kennedy Space Center in Florida

The Apollo 14 command module Kitty Hawk is on display at the Apollo/Saturn V Center at the Kennedy Space Center Visitor Complex after being on display at the United States Astronaut Hall of Fame near Titusville, Florida, for several years. At the time of its transfer of ownership from NASA to the Smithsonian in July 1977, it was on display at the facilities of North American Rockwell (the company that had constructed it) in Downey, California. The SM reentered Earth's atmosphere and was destroyed, though there was no tracking or sightings of it.

The S-IVB booster impacted the Moon on February 4 at 8.181°S 26.0305°W. The ascent stage of lunar module Antares impacted the Moon on February 7, 1971, at 00:45:25.7 UT (February 6, 7:45 pm EST), at 3.42°S 19.67°W. Antares' descent stage and the mission's other equipment remain at Fra Mauro at 3.65°S 17.47°W.

Photographs taken in 2009 by the Lunar Reconnaissance Orbiter were released on July 17, and the Fra Mauro equipment was the most visible Apollo hardware at that time, owing to particularly good lighting conditions. In 2011, the LRO returned to the landing site at a lower altitude to take higher resolution photographs.

== Gallery ==
Apollo 14 astronaut Ed Mitchell sets foot on the Moon.

Shepard and Mitchell erect a U.S. flag on the lunar surface.

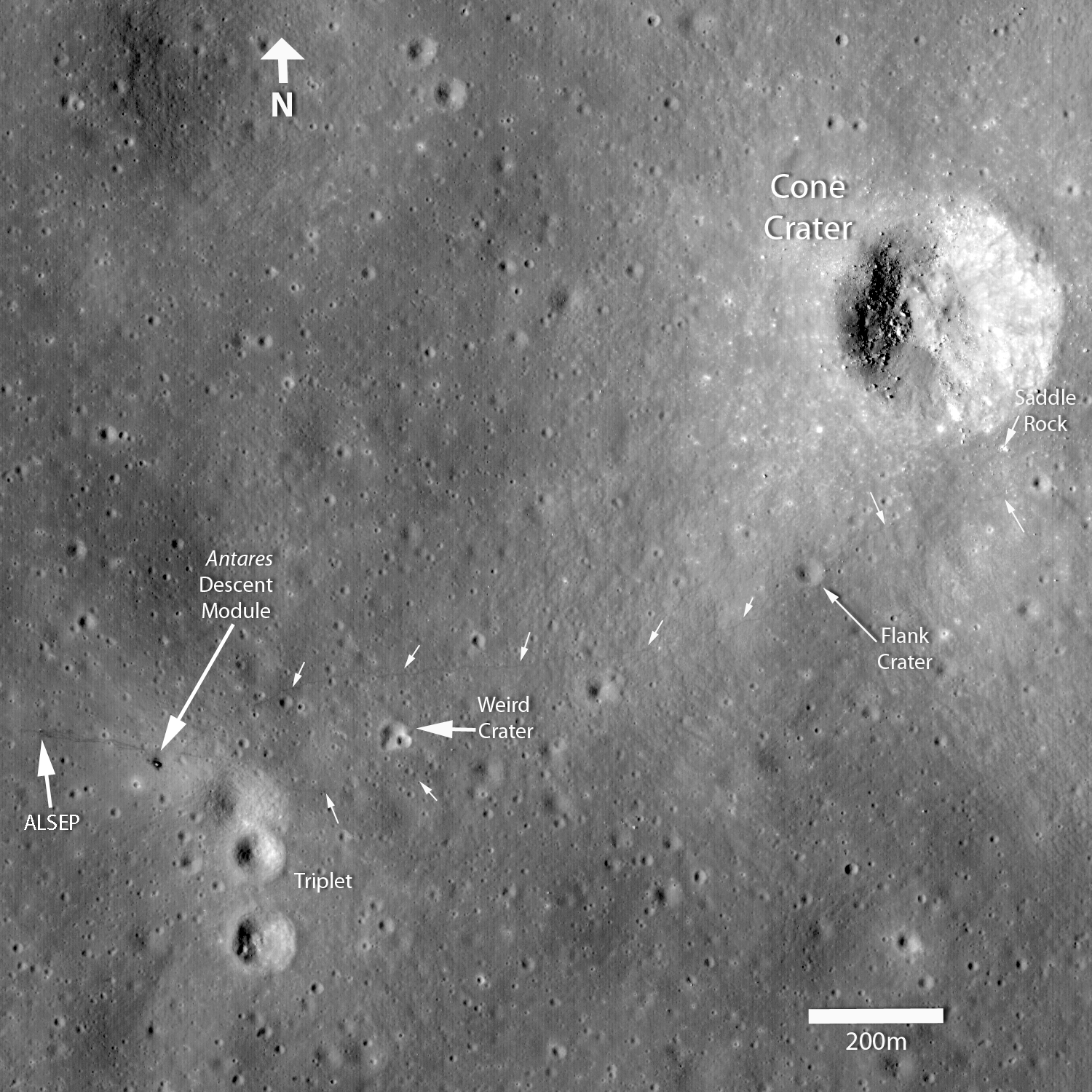
Apollo 14 landing site, 2009 photograph by Lunar Reconnaissance Orbiter

== See also ==
- Google Moon
- List of artificial objects on the Moon
- List of missions to the Moon
- List of spacewalks and moonwalks 1965–1999

== Bibliography ==
- Apollo 14 Mission Report (PDF). Washington, D.C.: NASA. 1971. MSC-04112. Archived from the original (PDF) on July 17, 2024.
- Apollo 14 Press Kit (PDF). Washington, D.C.: NASA. 1971. 71-3K. Archived from the original (PDF) on August 23, 2024.
- Apollo Program Summary Report (PDF). Houston, Texas: NASA. 1975. JSC-09423. Archived (PDF) from the original on October 9, 2022.
- Brooks, Courtney G.; Grimwood, James M.; Swenson, Loyd S. Jr. (1979). Chariots for Apollo: A History of Manned Lunar Spacecraft (PDF). NASA History Series. Washington, D.C.: Scientific and Technical Information Branch, NASA. ISBN 978-0-486-46756-6. LCCN 79001042. OCLC 4664449. NASA SP-4205. Archived (PDF) from the original on October 9, 2022.
- Chaikin, Andrew (1995) [1994]. A Man on the Moon: The Voyages of the Apollo Astronauts. New York: Penguin Books. ISBN 978-0-14-024146-4.
- Gatland, Kenneth (1976). Manned Spacecraft (Second ed.). New York: MacMillan. ISBN 978-0-02-542820-1.
- Lattimer, Dick (1985). All We Did Was Fly to the Moon. History-alive series. Vol. 1. Foreword by James A. Michener (1st ed.). Alachua, FL: Whispering Eagle Press. ISBN 978-0-9611228-0-5.
- Mitchell, Edgar (2014). Earthrise: My Adventures as an Apollo 14 Astronaut (eBook ed.). Chicago, Illinois: Chicago Review Press. ISBN 978-1-306-46317-1.
- Moseley, Willie G. (2011). Smoke Jumper, Moon Pilot: The Remarkable Life of Apollo 14 Astronaut Stuart Roosa. Morley, MO: Acclaim Press. ISBN 978-1-935001-76-8.
- Orloff, Richard W.; Harland, David M. (2006). Apollo: The Definitive Sourcebook. Chichester, UK: Praxis Publishing Company. ISBN 978-0-387-30043-6.
- Phinney, William C. (2015). Science Training History of the Apollo Astronauts (PDF). Houston, Texas: NASA. SP-2015-626. Archived (PDF) from the original on October 9, 2022.
- Shayler, David J.; Burgess, Colin (2017). The Last of NASA's Original Pilot Astronauts: Expanding the Space Frontier in the Late Sixties. Chichester, UK: Springer. ISBN 978-3-319-51014-9.
- Slayton, Donald K. "Deke"; Cassutt, Michael (1994). Deke! U.S. Manned Space: From Mercury to the Shuttle (1st ed.). New York: Forge. ISBN 978-0-312-85503-1.
- Wilhelms, Don E. (1993). To a Rocky Moon: A Geologist's History of Lunar Exploration. Tucson, Arizona: University of Arizona Press. ISBN 978-0-8165-1065-8.
