= Modular Equipment Transporter =

Vehicle used to haul equipment on the lunar surface

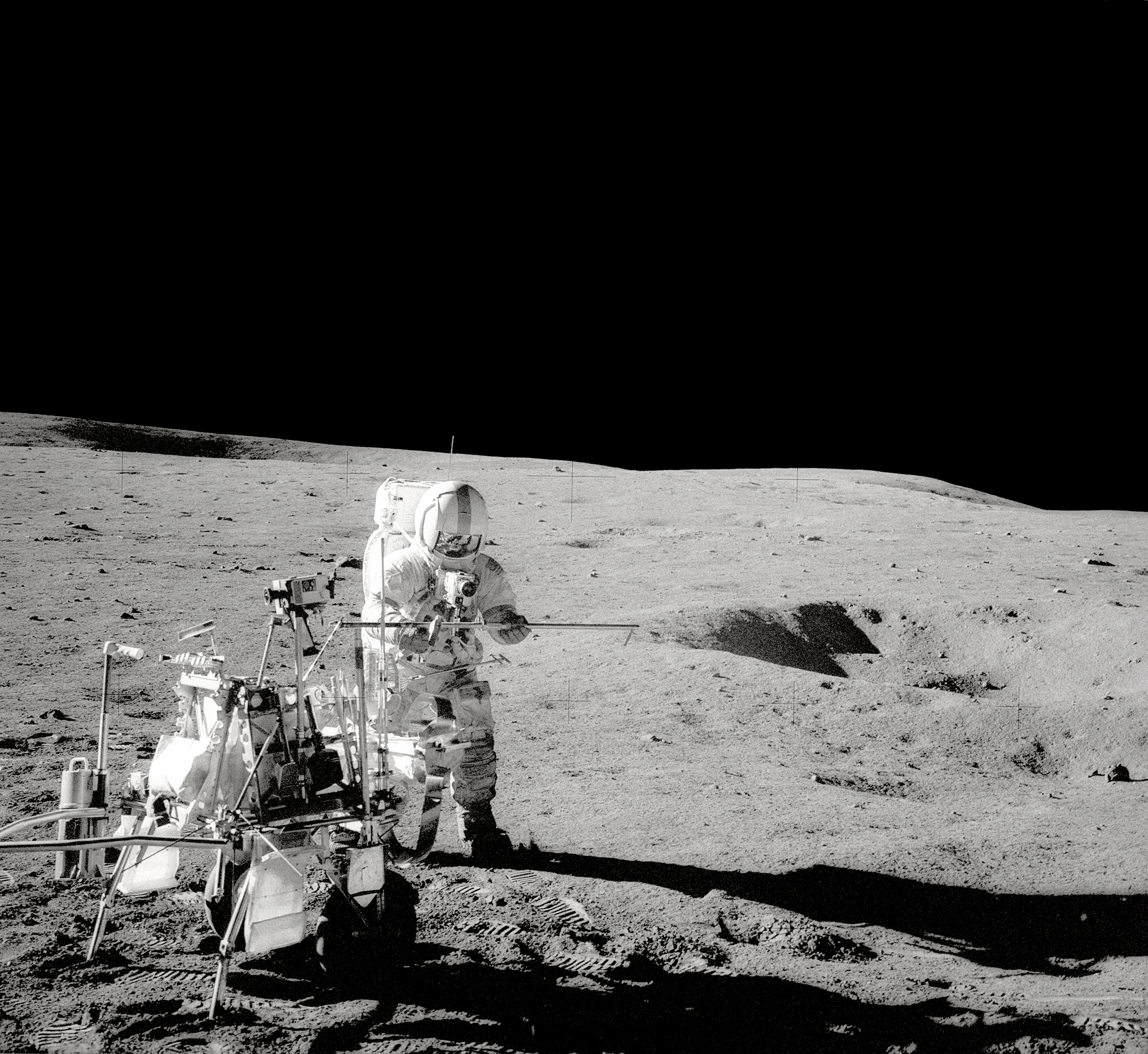
Alan Shepard stands next to the Modular Equipment Transporter during the 1971 Apollo 14 mission

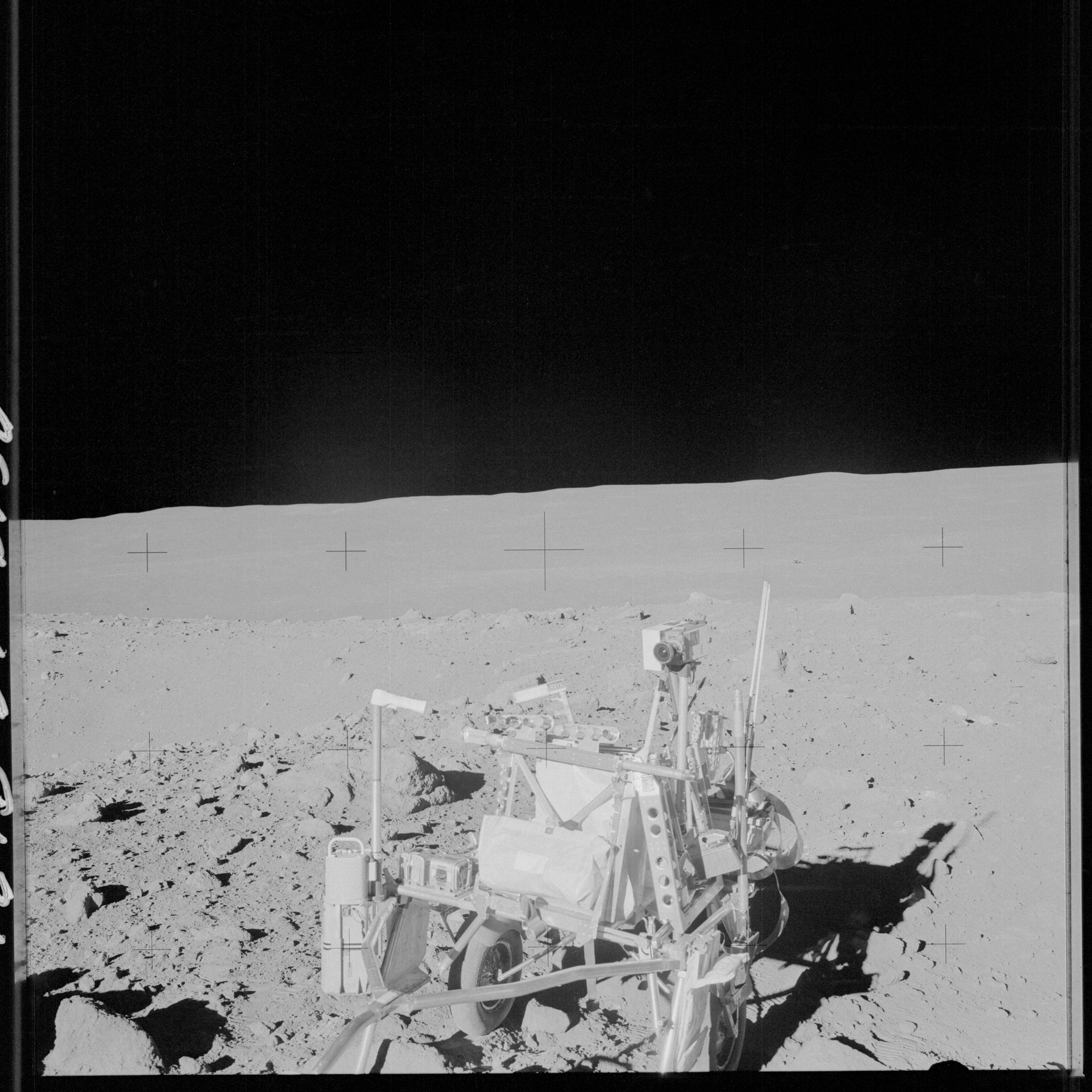
Closeup of the MET

The Modular Equipment Transporter (MET) was a two-wheeled, hand-pulled vehicle that was used as an equipment hauling device on traverses across the lunar surface. Designed after Apollo 12 astronauts Pete Conrad and Alan Bean had difficulties lugging their equipment significant distances to and from their Lunar Module, the MET primarily functioned as a portable workbench with a place for hand tools and their carrier, cameras, spare camera magazines, rock sample bags, environmental sample containers, and the portable magnetometer with its sensor and tripod. It was carried on the 1971 Apollo 14 mission and was planned to be used on Apollo 15, but was used only on Apollo 14 since Apollo 15's mission was changed to be the first to employ the motorized Lunar Roving Vehicle, which transported both astronauts and equipment.

Astronauts nicknamed the MET "the rickshaw". It was pulled using a pulling bar at the front. The majority of the payload of the MET consisted of part of the Apollo Lunar Surface Experiments Package (ALSEP)., including a portable magnetometer, as well as various tools and space to transport samples. The performance of the MET was described as "adequate". In fact, astronauts Alan Shepard and Edgar Mitchell were disappointed by the MET's performance. During one of the traverses they had to carry the MET together because it was too difficult to pull it through the rough lunar terrain.

The two nitrogen-filled rubber tires on the MET were the first tires on the Moon. They were designed by Goodyear Tire and Rubber Company and called Experimental Lunar Tires (XLTs). The biggest challenge for Goodyear was that NASA specifications required the inner tube be inflated to 1.5 psi on the Moon surface; a difficult task. A tire with 1.5 psi on Earth has an inflation pressure of 16.2 psi on the Moon because atmospheric pressure (14.7 psi) is not a factor there. Goodyear solved the gauge pressure problem by having NASA partially inflate the inner tube with nitrogen so that on the Moon it reached 1.5 psi. The tire maker gave the synthetic rubber tube a special coating to improve gas retention. These tires worked well for the small MET rickshaw. The later Lunar Roving Vehicle demanded wheels or tires that could handle a much greater weight and could travel much farther than the MET. NASA went with General Motors and they designed a wire-mesh wheel that didn't allow lunar dust to get stuck in the wheels.

== Design criteria ==
Data from Operator's Manual By General Electric

=== Dimensional limits ===
- Max. MET Weight (Empty): 30 Earth lbs
- Max. Payload Capability: 340 Earth lbs
- Workable height: 30 in
- Stowage Envelope: 28 in × 36 in × 8 in (710 mm × 910 mm × 200 mm)

=== Operation specifications ===
- Nominal Pulling Speed: 4-7 mph
- Nominal Draw Bar Pull: 3-5 mph
- Design Traverse 20,000 ft
- Capable of Traversing: up to 4" Diameter Rocks
- Tire Temperatures:
  - -60 °F on deployment
  - 0 °F to 200 °F when parked
  - 70 °F average when rolling
- Tire Pressure: 1.5 psia

== Items stowed on MET ==
Data from Operator's Manual by General Electric

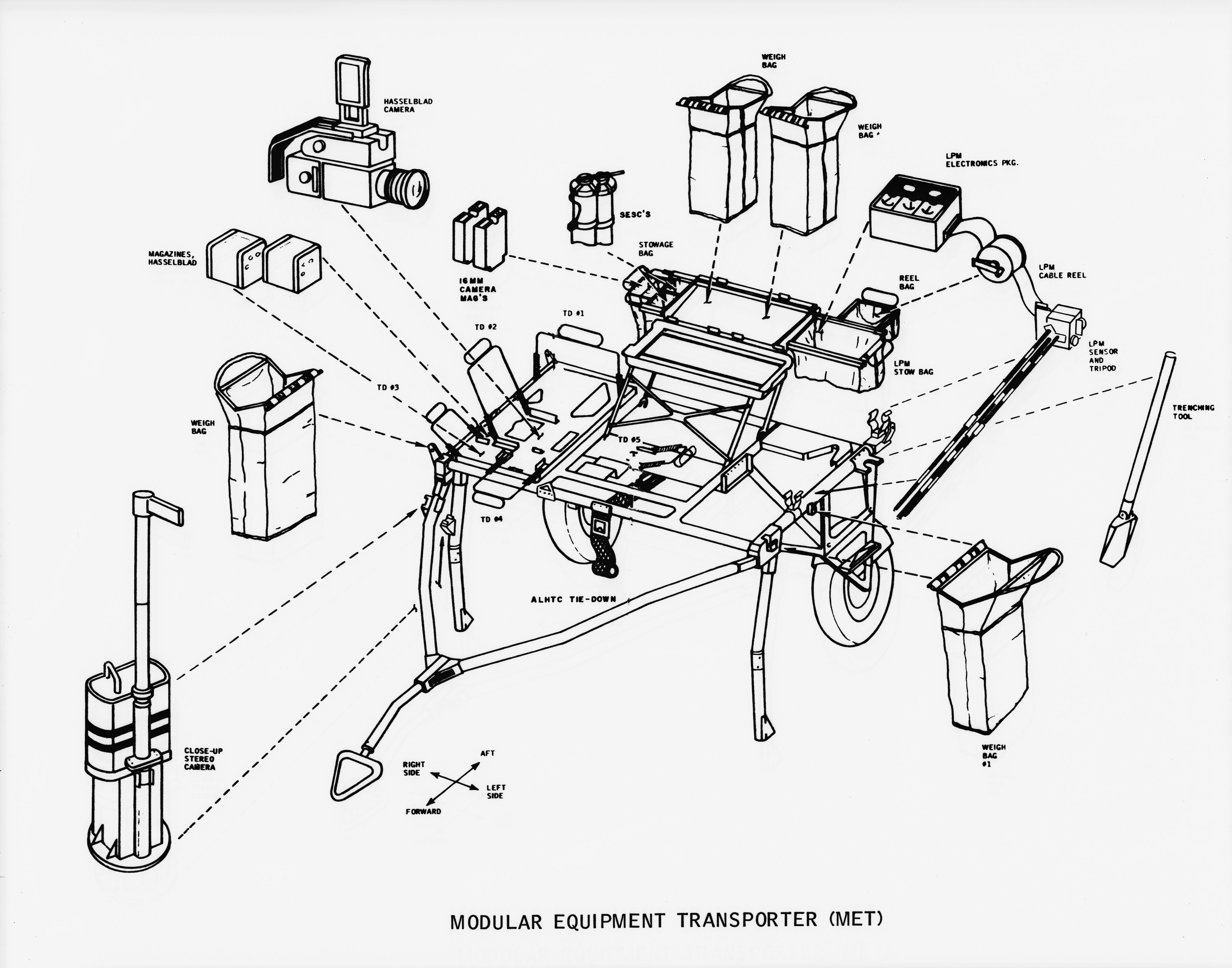
Line drawing of the Modular Equipment Transporter.

| Stowed Item # | Items Stowed | Quantity | Lunar Module Stowage/Code |
|---|---|---|---|
| 1 | Camera/Power Pack (16 mm) | 1 (on tool carrier) | Ascent: A4 |
| 2 | Magazine (16 mm) | 3 (1 in camera) | Ascent: A4 |
| 3 | Camera (70 mm Hasselblad) | 1 | Ascent: F2B |
| 4 | Magazine (70 mm) | 3 (1 in camera) | Ascent: F2B |
| 5 | Handle (70 mm) | 1 | Ascent: F2B |
| 6 | Trigger (70 mm) | 1 | Ascent: F2B |
| 7 | RCU/70 mm Bracket | 1 | Ascent: F9A |
| 8 | Camera Assembly | 1 | Descent: M1R |
| 9 | Magazine Assembly | 2 (1 in camera) | Descent: M1F |
| 10 | Magazine Assembly Cover | 1 | Descent: M1F |
| 11 | RCU/LGEC Bracket | 1 | Descent |
| 12 | Camera (Close-up/stereo) | 1 | Descent:M1N |
| 13 | Weigh Bags | 4 | Descent: M1P |
| 14 | Trenching Tool | 1 | Descent: M1W |
| 15 | Special Environment Sample Container | 2 | Descent: M1P |
| 16 | Portable Magnetometer: *Tripod & Sensor*Cable Reel*Electronics Package | 1 | Descent: Adjacent Sequence Bay |
| 17 | ALHTC | 1 | Descent: ALSEP |
| 18 | Camera Staff | 1 | Descent: ALSEP |
| 19 | Hammer | 1 | Descent: M1K |
| 20 | Scoop | 1 | Descent: M1M |
| 21 | Lens/Brush | 1 | Descent: ALSEP |
| 22 | Tongs | 1 | Descent: M1H |
| 23 | Extension Handle | 5 | Descent: M1G |
| 24 | Core Tubes | 2 | Descent: 1 in SRC |
| 25 | 35 Bag Dispenser | 1 | Descent: M1T |
| 26 | Penetrometer | 1 | Descent: ALSEP |
| 27 | Gnomon | 1 | Descent: M1A |
| 27A | Color Chart and Traverse Map | 1 EA | Descent: ALSEP |
