= Stuart Roosa =

American astronaut (1933–1994)

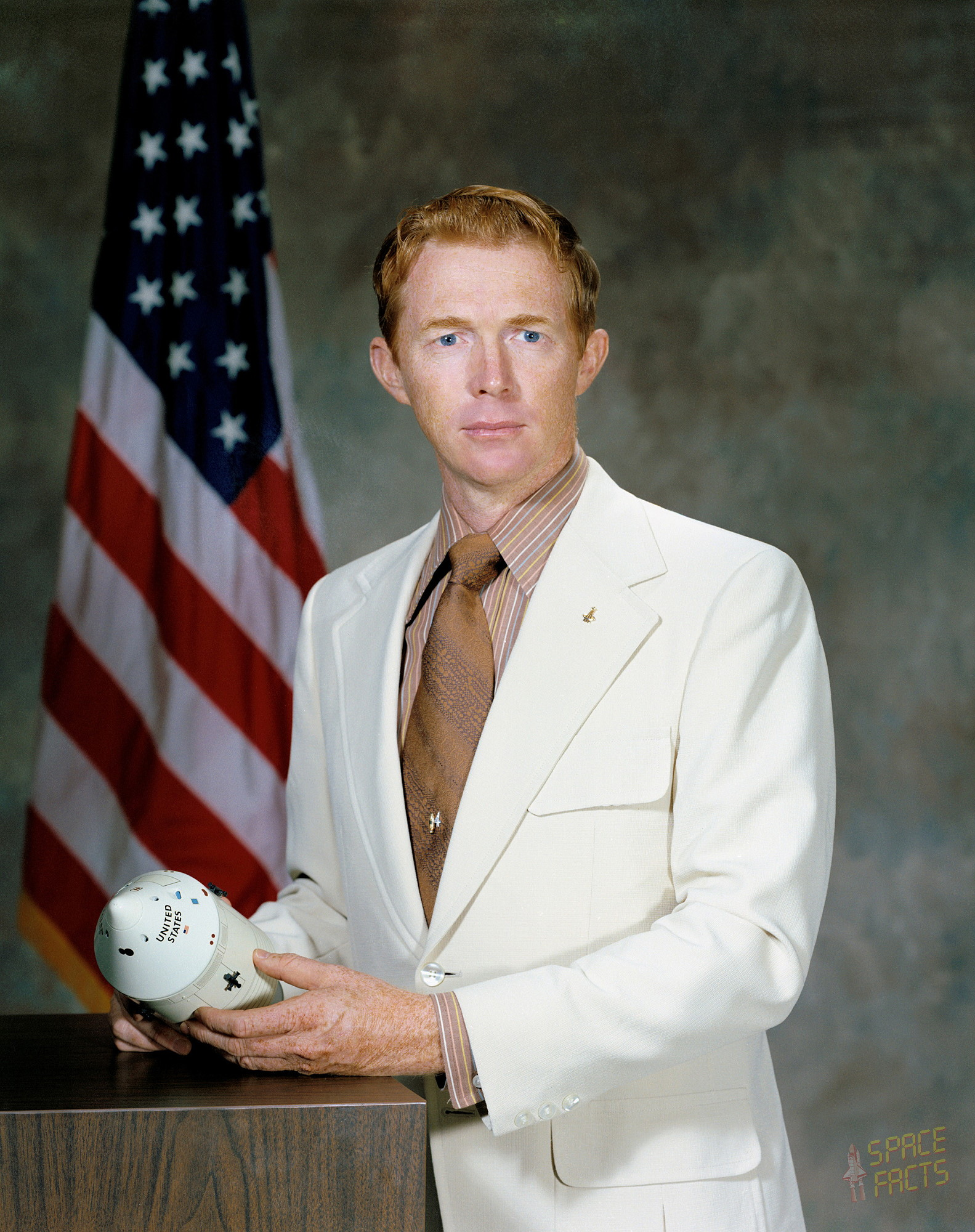
- Roosa in 1971
- Born: Stuart Allen Roosa; August 16, 1933; Durango, Colorado, U.S.
- Died: December 12, 1994 (aged 61); Falls Church, Virginia, U.S.
- Resting place: Arlington National Cemetery
- Education: Oklahoma State University, Stillwater; University of Arizona; University of Colorado Boulder (BS)
- Spouse: Joan C. Barrett
- Children: 4
- Awards: NASA Distinguished Service Medal
- Space career

NASA astronaut
- Rank: Colonel, U.S. Air Force
- Time in space: 9 days, 1 minute
- Selection: NASA Group 5 (1966)
- Mission: Apollo 14
- Retired: February 1, 1976

Signature
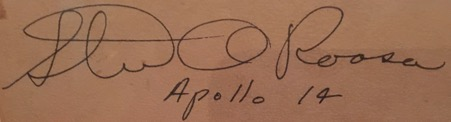

Stuart Allen Roosa (August 16, 1933 – December 12, 1994) was an American aeronautical engineer, smokejumper, United States Air Force pilot, test pilot, and NASA astronaut, who was the Command Module Pilot for the Apollo 14 mission. The mission lasted from January 31 to February 9, 1971, and was the third mission to land astronauts (Alan Shepard and Edgar Mitchell) on the Moon. While Shepard and Mitchell spent two days on the lunar surface, Roosa conducted experiments from orbit in the Command Module Kitty Hawk. He was one of the 24 Apollo astronauts who reached the Moon, which he orbited 34 times.

== Biography ==
=== Early life and education ===
Roosa was born on August 16, 1933, in Durango, Colorado, to parents Dewey Roosa (1896–1990) and Lorine Roosa (née DeLozier) (1904–1992) and grew up in Claremore, Oklahoma. He attended Justus Tiawah Grade School and Claremore High School in Claremore, Oklahoma, from which he graduated in 1951. Thereafter, he studied at Oklahoma State University and the University of Arizona, before graduating with a Bachelor of Science degree in aeronautical engineering with honors from the University of Colorado Boulder in 1960.

=== Military service ===
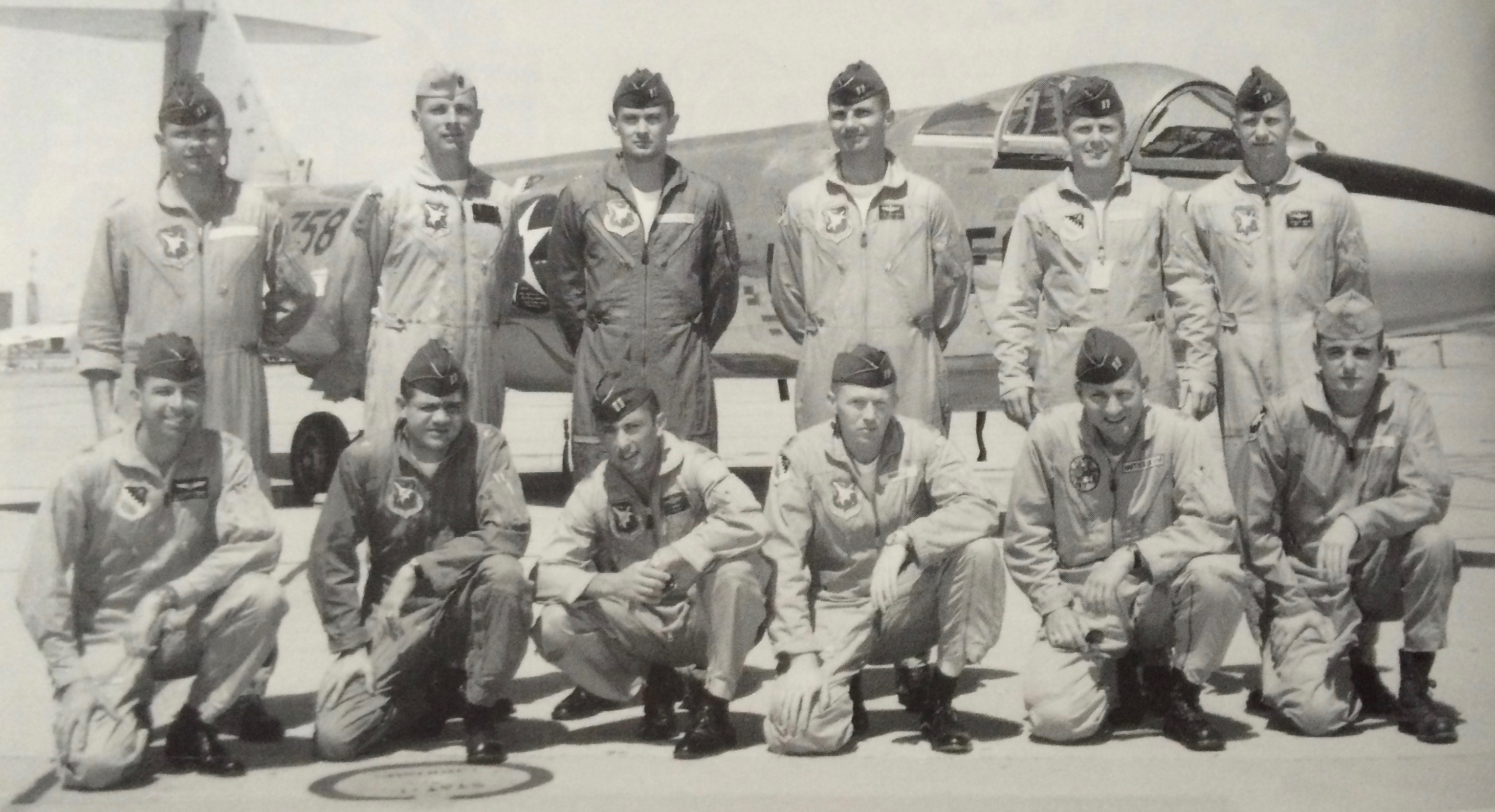
In this photo of the Aerospace Research Pilot School's Class 64C, Roosa is in the front row, fourth from the left. To his left is Hank Hartsfield; the top row includes Al Worden (rightmost) and Charlie Duke (third from the left).

Roosa began his career as a smokejumper with the U.S. Forest Service, dropping into at least four active fires in Oregon and California during the 1953 fire season. He was a graduate of the Aviation Cadet Program at Williams Air Force Base, Arizona, where he received his flight training commission in the U.S. Air Force. He also attended the U.S. Air Force Aerospace Research Pilot School (Class 64C) and was an experimental test pilot at Edwards Air Force Base in California before being selected for the astronaut class of 1966.

From July 1962 to August 1964, Roosa was a maintenance flight test pilot at Olmstead Air Force Base, Pennsylvania, flying F-101 Voodoo aircraft. He was a fighter pilot at Langley Air Force Base, Virginia, where he flew the F-84F Thunderstreak and F-100 Super Sabre aircraft. Following graduation from the University of Colorado, under the U.S. Air Force Institute of Technology Program, he served as Chief of Service Engineering (AFLC) at Tachikawa Air Base, Japan, for two years.

=== NASA career ===
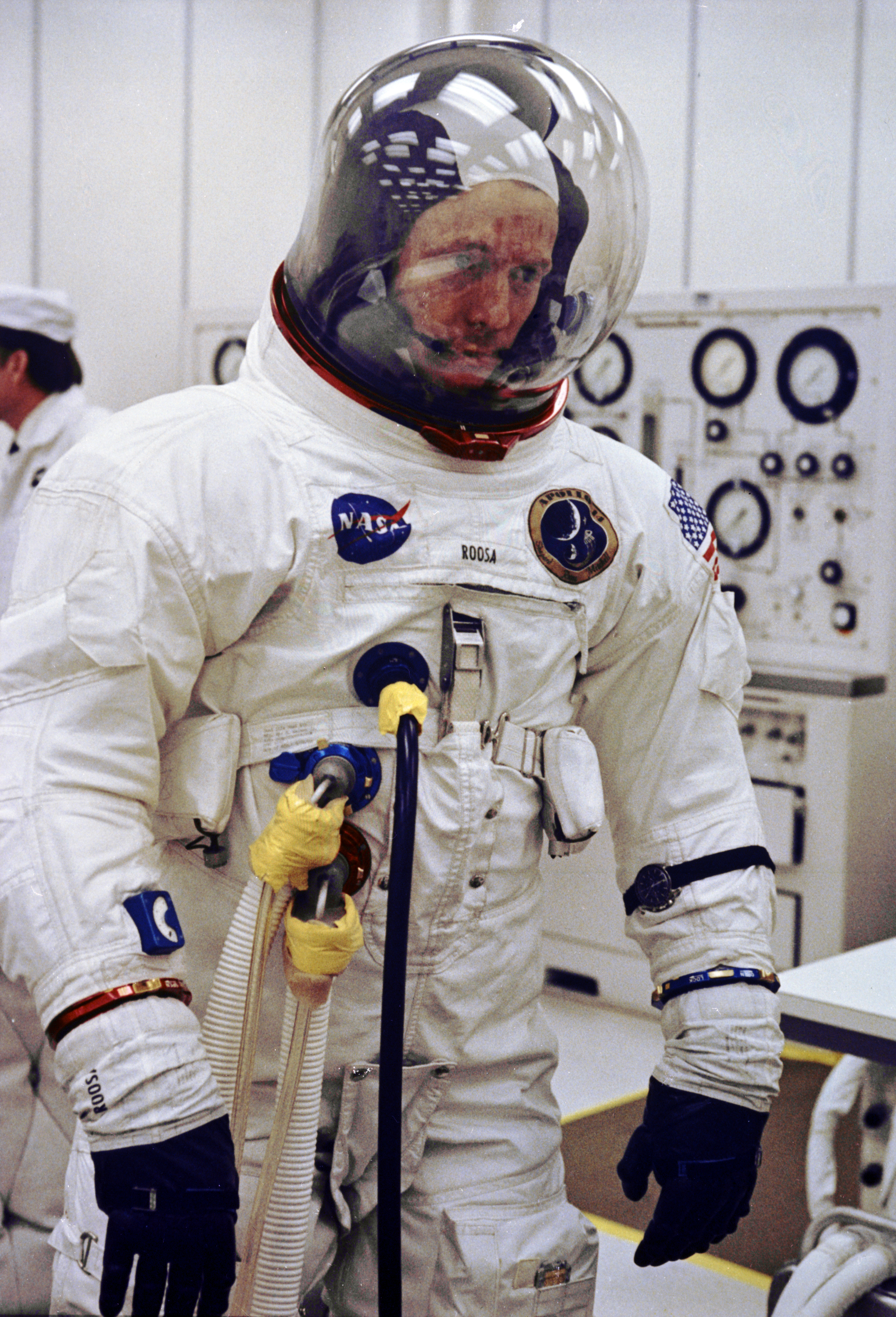
Roosa undergoing final space suit check before liftoff of Apollo 14

Roosa was one of 19 people selected as part of the astronaut class of 1966. He was the Capsule communicator (CAPCOM) at the Launch Complex 34 blockhouse during the Apollo 1 fire on January 27, 1967. In 1969, he served as a member of the astronaut support crew for the Apollo 9 mission.

On Apollo 14, he spent 33 hours in solo orbit around the Moon, conducting an extensive series of experiments. As part of a joint U.S. Forest Service/NASA project, he carried seeds from loblolly pine, sycamore, sweet gum, redwood, and Douglas fir trees. The seeds were germinated on his return and planted throughout the United States, becoming known as the "Moon Trees".

Roosa served as backup Command Module Pilot for Apollo 16 and Apollo 17. Based on crew rotations, he would probably have commanded one of the last missions had they not been cancelled. He was assigned to the Space Shuttle program until his retirement as a colonel from the Air Force in 1976.

Roosa logged 5,500 hours of flying time; 5,000 hours in jet aircraft. He also logged 217 hours in space.

=== Post-NASA career ===
Roosa, who attended Harvard Business School's six-week Advanced Management Program in 1973, later held a number of positions in international and U.S. businesses. He founded Gulf Coast Coors in 1981; he served as its president until his death.

=== Death ===
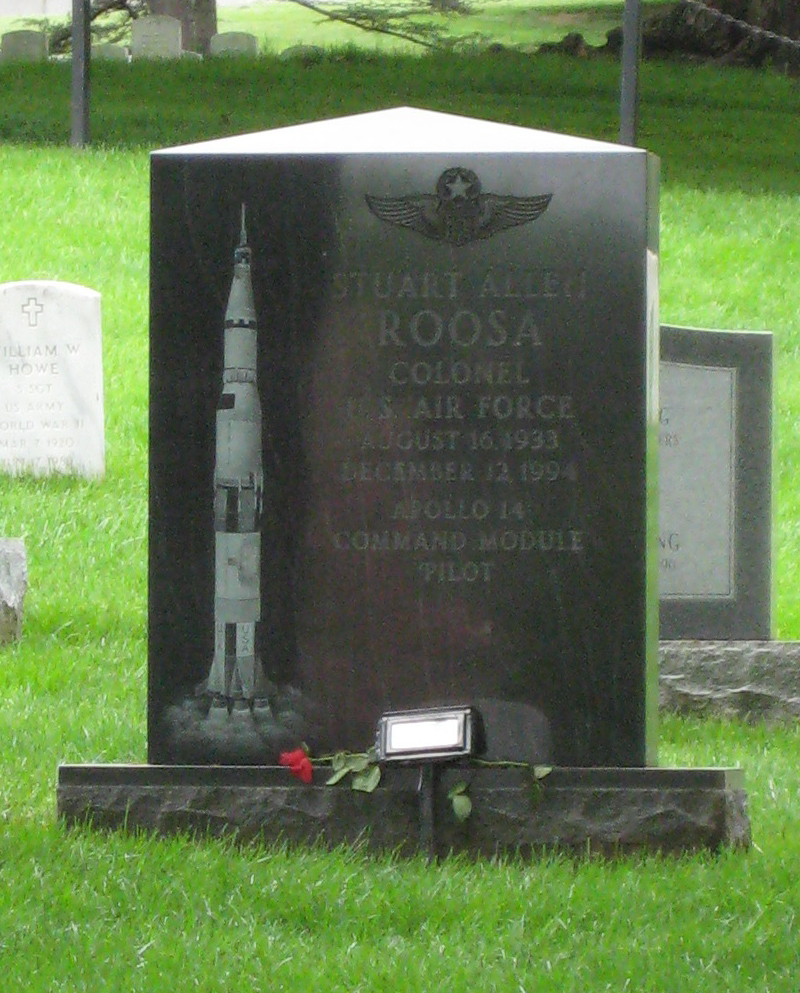
Roosa's tombstone in section 7A of Arlington National Cemetery

On December 12, 1994, Roosa died at age 61 in Washington, D.C., from complications of pancreatitis.

Roosa is buried in Arlington National Cemetery. His wife Joan died on October 30, 2007, in Gulfport, Mississippi. She was interred at Arlington with her husband.

== Organizations ==
Roosa's memberships include the Society of Experimental Test Pilots, New York Safari Club, Board of Directors, People-to-People Sports Committee, Hunting Hall of Fame, Circumnavigators Club, Explorers Club, Commemorative Air Force, Shikar-Safari-Club and Gulfport Yacht Club.

== Awards and honors ==
Roosa's honors include the NASA Distinguished Service Medal; the MSC Superior Achievement Award (1970); the Air Force Command Pilot Astronaut Wings; the Air Force Distinguished Service Medal; the Arnold Air Society's John F. Kennedy Award (1971); the City of New York Gold Medal (1971); the American Astronautical Society's Flight Achievement Award (1971); the Order of Tehad (1973); and the Order of the Central African Empire (1973). Additionally, an elementary school in Claremore, Oklahoma is named in his honor. He received an honorary LL.D. from University of St. Thomas, Houston in 1971.

He was one of five Oklahoman astronauts inducted into the Oklahoma Aviation and Space Hall of Fame in 1980 and he was inducted into the International Space Hall of Fame in 1983. Roosa was posthumously inducted into the U.S. Astronaut Hall of Fame in 1997.

== In media ==
- In the HBO miniseries From the Earth to the Moon (1998), Roosa was played by George Newbern.
- The book Smoke Jumper, Moon Pilot (2011), by Willie G. Moseley, is a biography on Roosa's life.
- In 2013, footage of Roosa's son holding a photo of Roosa with two of his granddaughters appears in USAA insurance television ads promoting availability to family members.

== See also ==
- The Astronaut Monument
