= Ptolemaeus (lunar crater) =

Crater on the Moon

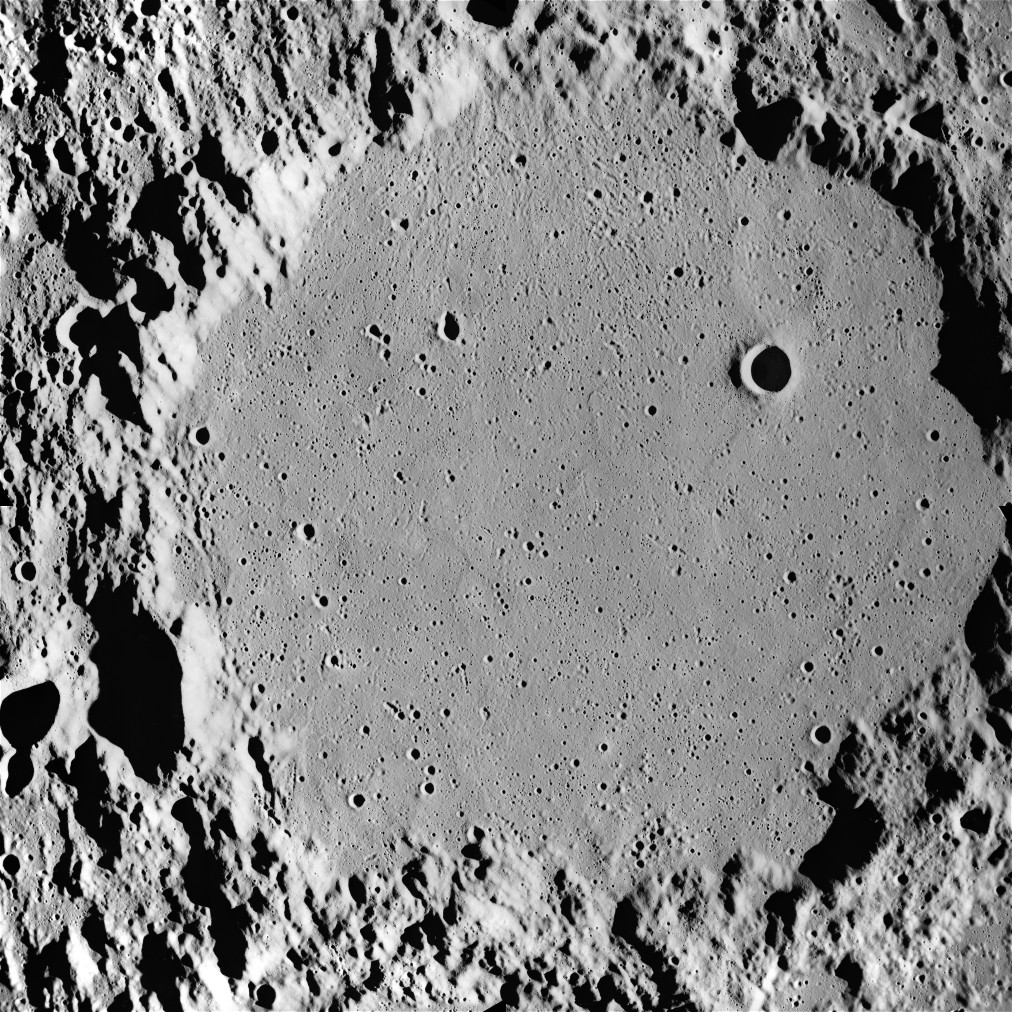
- Ptolemaeus from Apollo 16. NASA photo.
- Coordinates: 9.2°S 1.8°W
- Diameter: 154 km
- Depth: 2.4 km
- Colongitude: 3° at sunrise
- Formation: Pre-Nectarian
- Eponym: Claudius Ptolemaeus

Ptolemaeus is an ancient lunar impact crater close to the center of the near side, named for Claudius Ptolemy, the Greco-Roman writer, mathematician, astronomer, geographer and astrologer. It measures approximately 154 kilometers in diameter. T. W. Webb called it "a magnificent lake, whose surface at sunrise or sunset is occasionally seen all roughened with ridges like waves".

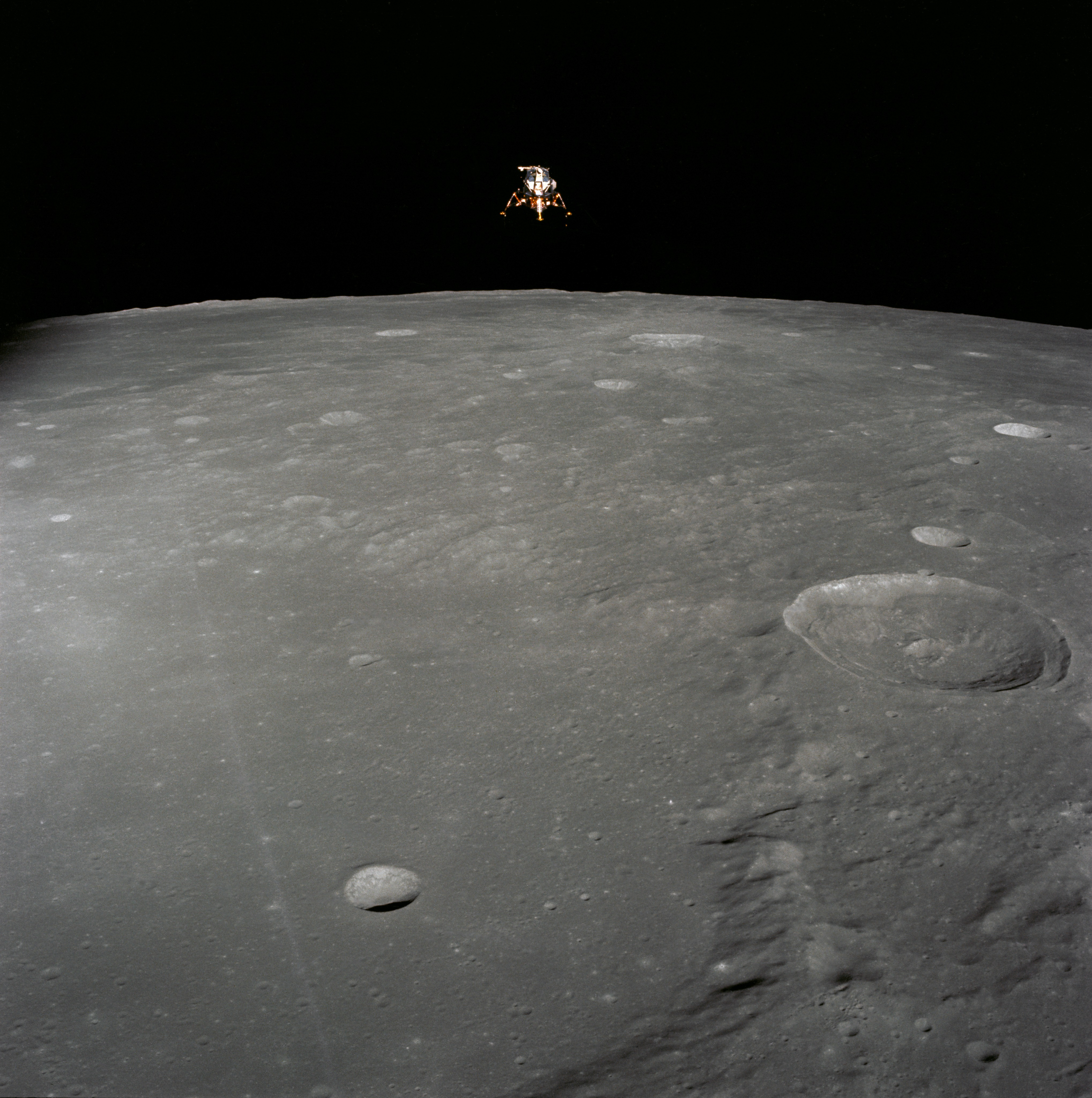
The Apollo 12 lunar module Intrepid flies over Ptolemaeus and the smaller Ammonius within it. Herschel lies to the right. NASA photo.

== Description ==
To the south-southwest, Ptolemaeus is joined to the rim of the crater Alphonsus by a section of rugged, irregular terrain, and these form a prominent chain with Arzachel to the south. To the southeast is Albategnius and to the north is the smaller but well-defined Herschel.

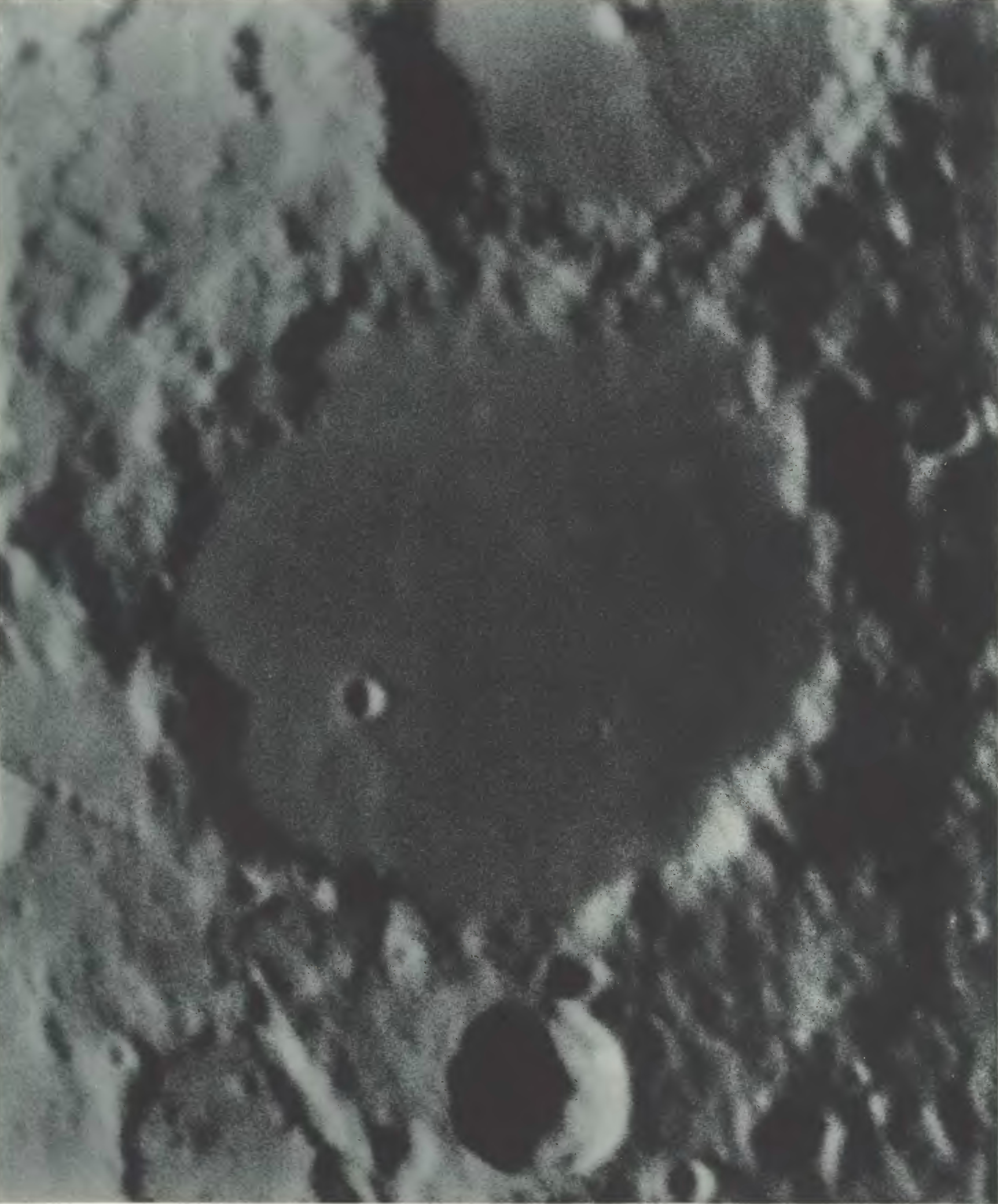
Ptolemaeus crater in Weinek's Lunar Atlas from 1897, on the photo, north is downwards

The features of Ptolemaeus are highlighted when the Sun is at low angles during the first and last quarter. At full Moon the Sun is directly overhead and the crater contours become more difficult to discern.

The crater has a low, irregular outer rim that is heavily worn and impacted with multiple smaller craters. The rim has a discernibly polygonal shape, although overall it remains circular. The largest of the peaks along the rim, designated Ptolemaeus Gamma (γ), has an altitude of 2.9 km and is located along the northwest rim. The crater has no central peak, a lava-flooded floor, and lacks a ray system. Impact sites of this form are often termed walled plains, due to their resemblance to the maria.

The somewhat dark-hued floor of Ptolemaeus is notable for several ghost craters, formed where lava has covered a pre-existing crater. These leave only a slight rise where the rim existed, and are difficult to detect except at low angles of sunlight. There are also multiple smaller craters across the floor surface, most notably Ammonius in the northeastern quadrant.

On either side of this crater are linear, irregular gashes in the lunar surface, forming valley-like features. These features are approximately parallel to each other and radiate from the direction of Mare Imbrium to the north-northwest.

== Satellite craters ==
By convention these features are identified on lunar maps by placing the letter on the side of the crater midpoint that is closest to Ptolemaeus.

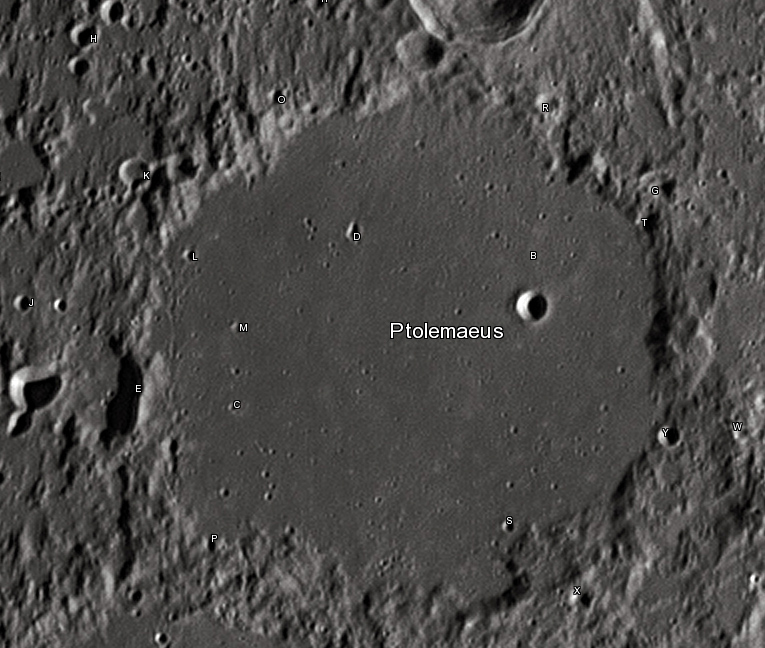
Ptolemaeus crater and its satellite craters taken from Earth in 2012 at the University of Hertfordshire's Bayfordbury Observatory with the telescopes Meade LX200 14" and Lumenera Skynyx 2-1

Ptolemaeus	Latitude	Longitude	Diameter
B	7.9° S	0.7° W	17 km
C	10.1° S	3.3° W	3 km
D	8.2° S	2.5° W	4 km
E	10.2° S	4.5° W	32 km
G	7.1° S	0.1° E	7 km
H	7.1° S	5.4° W	7 km
J	9.6° S	5.4° W	5 km
K	8.2° S	4.6° W	8 km
L	8.8° S	4.0° W	4 km
M	9.4° S	3.4° W	3 km
O	7.2° S	3.6° W	5 km
P	11.4° S	3.2° W	4 km
R	6.7° S	1.2° W	6 km
S	10.5° S	0.5° W	4 km
T	7.5° S	0.0° E	7 km
W	9.1° S	1.4° E	4 km
X	10.9° S	0.3° E	4 km
Y	9.3° S	0.7° E	6 km

The following crater has been renamed by the IAU.

- Ptolemaeus A — See Ammonius.

== See also ==
- Ptolemaeus (Martian crater)
- 4001 Ptolemaeus
