= Clifford E. Charlesworth =

NASA flight director

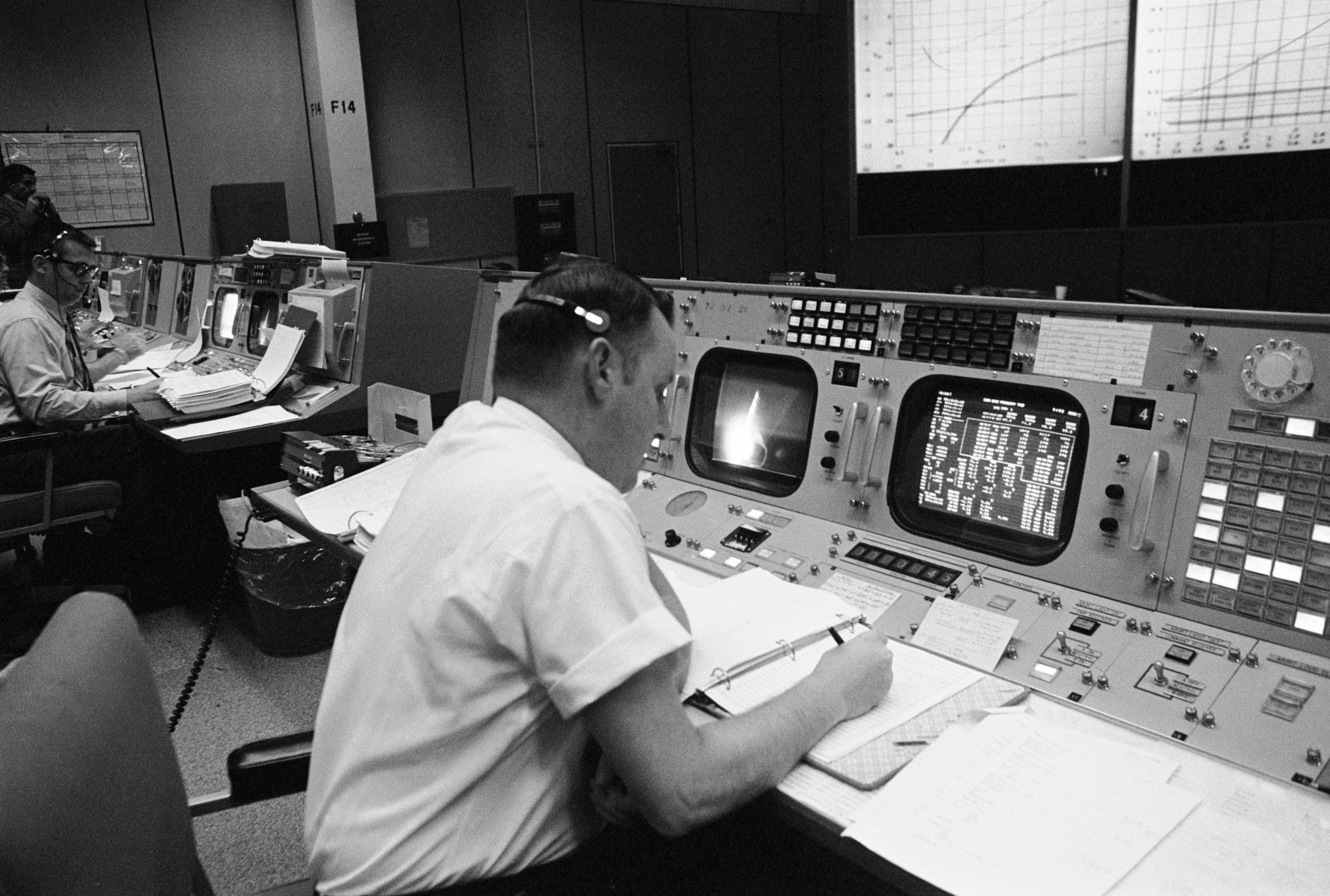
- Charlesworth at his console during the Apollo 8 lunar mission, December 21, 1968
- Born: Clifford Eugene Charlesworth; November 29, 1931; Red Wing, Minnesota, U.S.
- Died: January 28, 1991 (aged 59); Friendswood, Texas, U.S.
- Resting place: Forest Park East Cemetery, Webster, Texas, U.S.
- Education: Mississippi College, B.S. 1958
- Occupations: Flight director during Gemini and Apollo programs
- Years active: 1962–1988
- Employer: NASA
- Known for: Flight Director during first lunar landing Apollo 8, Apollo 11 and Apollo 12
- Awards: NASA Distinguished Service Medal; NASA Outstanding Leadership Medal; NASA Exceptional Service Medal

Clifford Eugene Charlesworth (November 29, 1931 – January 28, 1991) was a NASA Flight Director during the Gemini and Apollo programs, including the Apollo 11 Moon landing mission.

== Biography ==
Clifford Eugene Charlesworth was born on November 29, 1931, in Red Wing, Minnesota, and grew up in Mississippi. He completed his education at Mississippi College with a bachelor's degree in physics in 1958. After a time as a civil servant with the United States Navy and the Pershing missile program of the United States Army, he joined NASA in 1962. He worked at the Manned Spacecraft Center in Houston, Texas, until 1970. He served as the Flight Director on Gemini 11 and Gemini 12, and as one of the Flight Directors on Apollo 8, the first mission to orbit the Moon; Apollo 11, the first mission to land on the Moon; and Apollo 12, the second Moon landing mission. From 1970 to 1972 he was manager of the Earth observation satellite program. He then worked as Deputy Head of the Payload Section of the Space Shuttle program, as Deputy Director of the Johnson Space Center and as Director of Space Operations before he retired in 1988.

For his services to NASA, Charlesworth was awarded the agency's Exceptional Service Medal in 1969, Outstanding Leadership Medal in 1981 and Distinguished Service Medal in 1982. He was a member of the American Astronautical Society and the American Institute of Aeronautics and Astronautics.

He died from a heart attack on January 28, 1991, at his home in Friendswood, Texas. He was buried in Forest Park East Cemetery in Webster, Texas, with his wife Jewell, who had died in 1988.
