= Apollo 12 =

Second crewed Moon landing

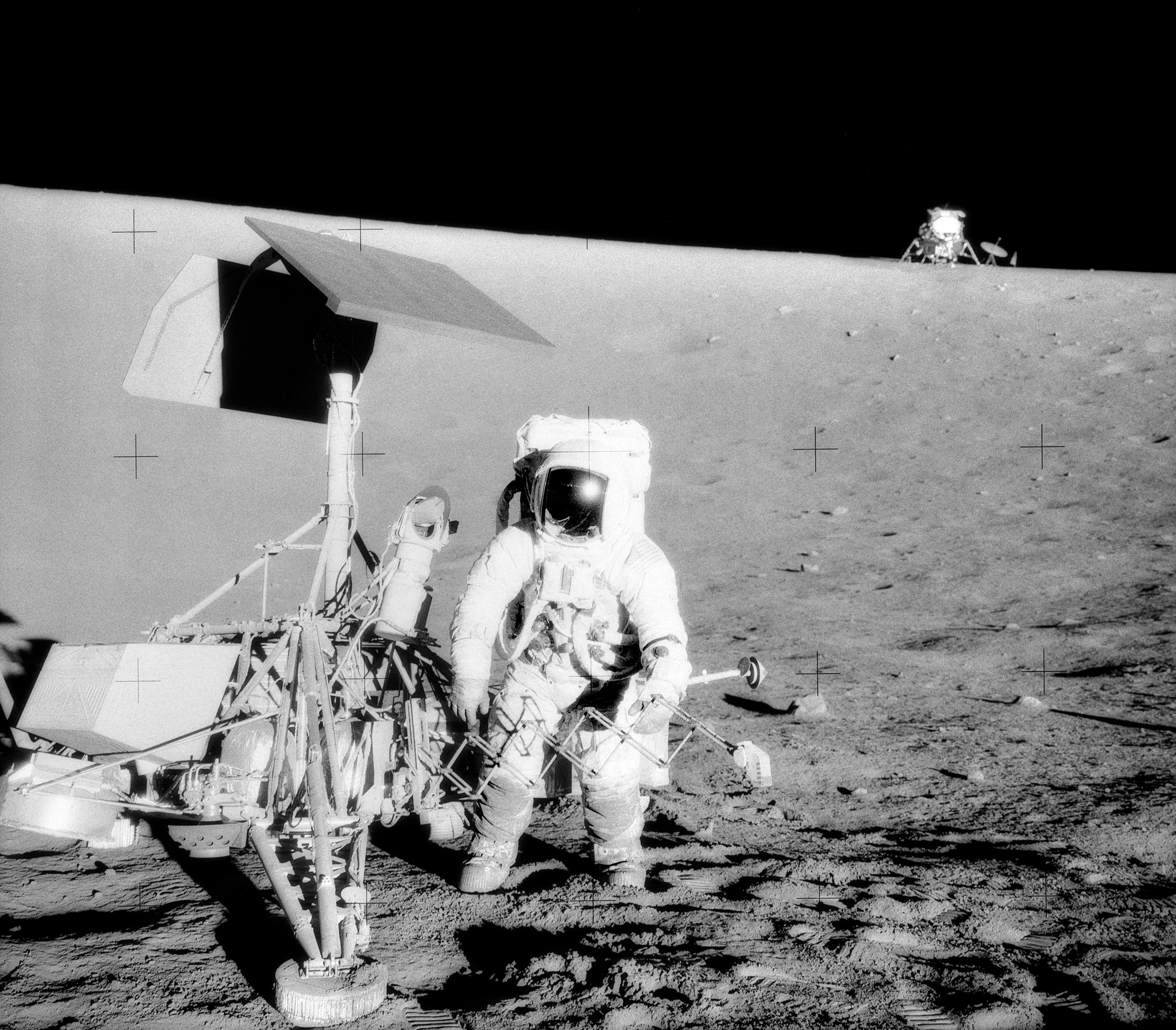
- Commander Pete Conrad studies the Surveyor 3 spacecraft, which had landed two years previously; the Apollo Lunar Module, Intrepid, can be seen at top right.
- Mission type: Crewed lunar landing (H)
- Operator: NASA
- COSPAR ID: CSM: 1969-099A; LM: 1969-099C
- SATCAT no.: CSM: 4225; LM: 4226
- Mission duration: 10 days, 4 hours, 36 minutes, 24 seconds

Spacecraft properties
- Spacecraft: Command and service module CSM-108; Lunar Module LM-6
- Manufacturer: CSM: North American Rockwell; LM: Grumman
- Launch mass: 49,915 kg (110,044 lb)
- Landing mass: 5,010 kg (11,050 lb)

Crew
- Crew size: 3
- Members: Charles Conrad Jr.; Richard F. Gordon Jr.; Alan L. Bean
- Callsign: CSM: Yankee Clipper; Lunar Module: Intrepid

Start of mission
- Launch date: November 14, 1969, 16:22:00 UTC (11:22 am EST)
- Rocket: Saturn V SA-507
- Launch site: Kennedy, LC-39A

End of mission
- Recovered by: USS Hornet
- Landing date: November 24, 1969, 20:58:24 UTC (10:58:24 am HST)
- Landing site: South Pacific Ocean (15°46.6′S 165°9′W)

Orbital parameters
- Reference system: Selenocentric
- Periselene altitude: 101.1 km (54.59 nmi; 62.8 mi)
- Aposelene altitude: 122.4 km (66.1 nmi; 76.1 mi)

Lunar orbiter
- Orbital insertion: November 18, 1969, 03:47:23 UTC
- Orbital departure: November 21, 1969, 20:49:16 UTC
- Orbits: 45

Lunar lander
- Spacecraft component: Lunar Module (LM)
- Landing date: November 19, 1969, 06:54:35 UTC
- Return launch: November 20, 1969, 14:25:47 UTC
- Landing site: Ocean of Storms 3.01239°S 23.42157°W
- Sample mass: 34.35 kg (75.7 lb)
- Surface EVAs: 2
- EVA duration: Total: 7 hours, 45 minutes, 18 seconds; First: 3 hours, 56 minutes, 03 seconds; Second: 3 hours, 49 minutes, 15 seconds

Docking with Lunar Module
- Docking date: November 14, 1969, 19:48:53 UTC
- Undocking date: November 19, 1969, 04:16:02 UTC

Docking with Lunar Module ascent stage
- Docking date: November 20, 1969, 17:58:20 UTC
- Undocking date: November 20, 1969, 20:21:31 UTC
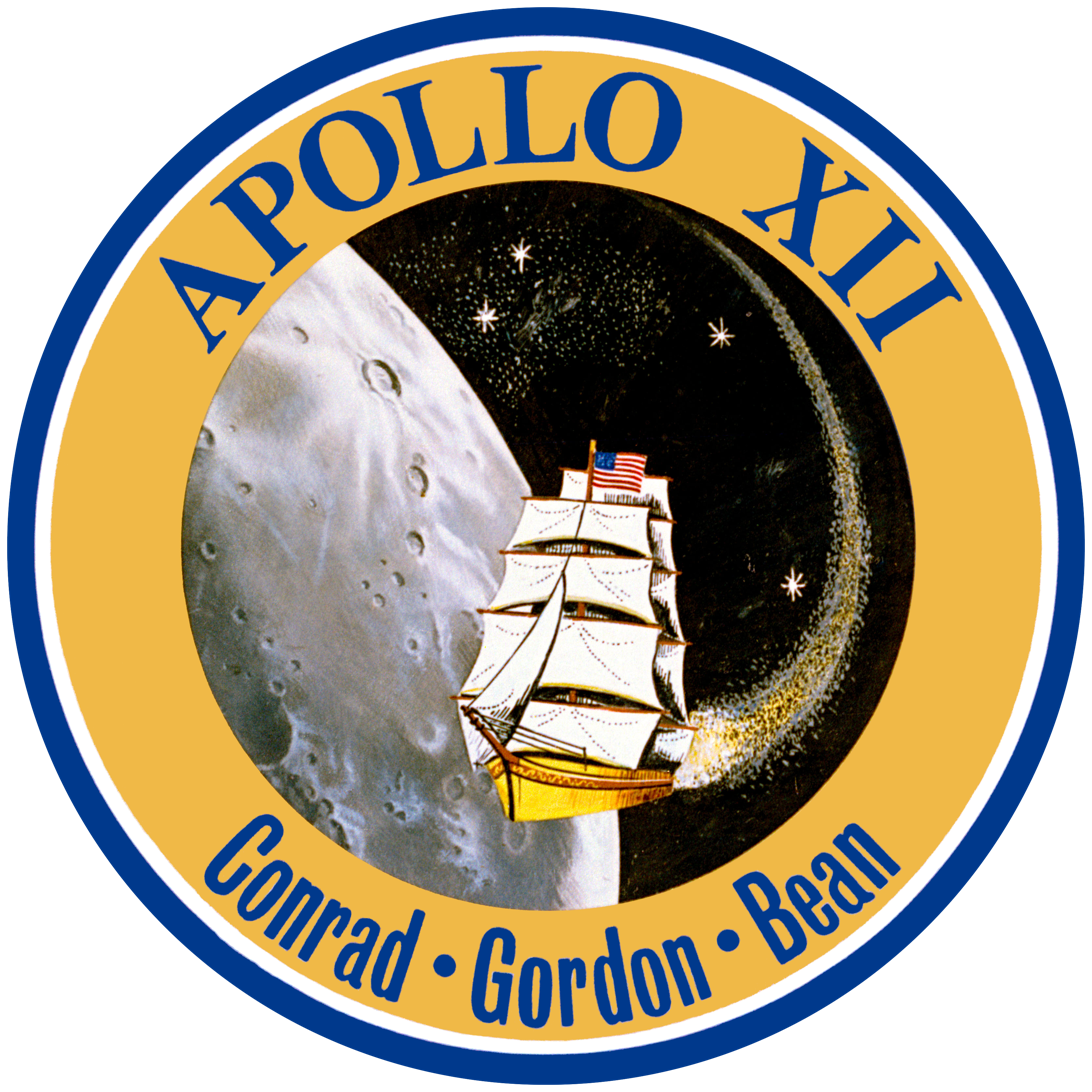
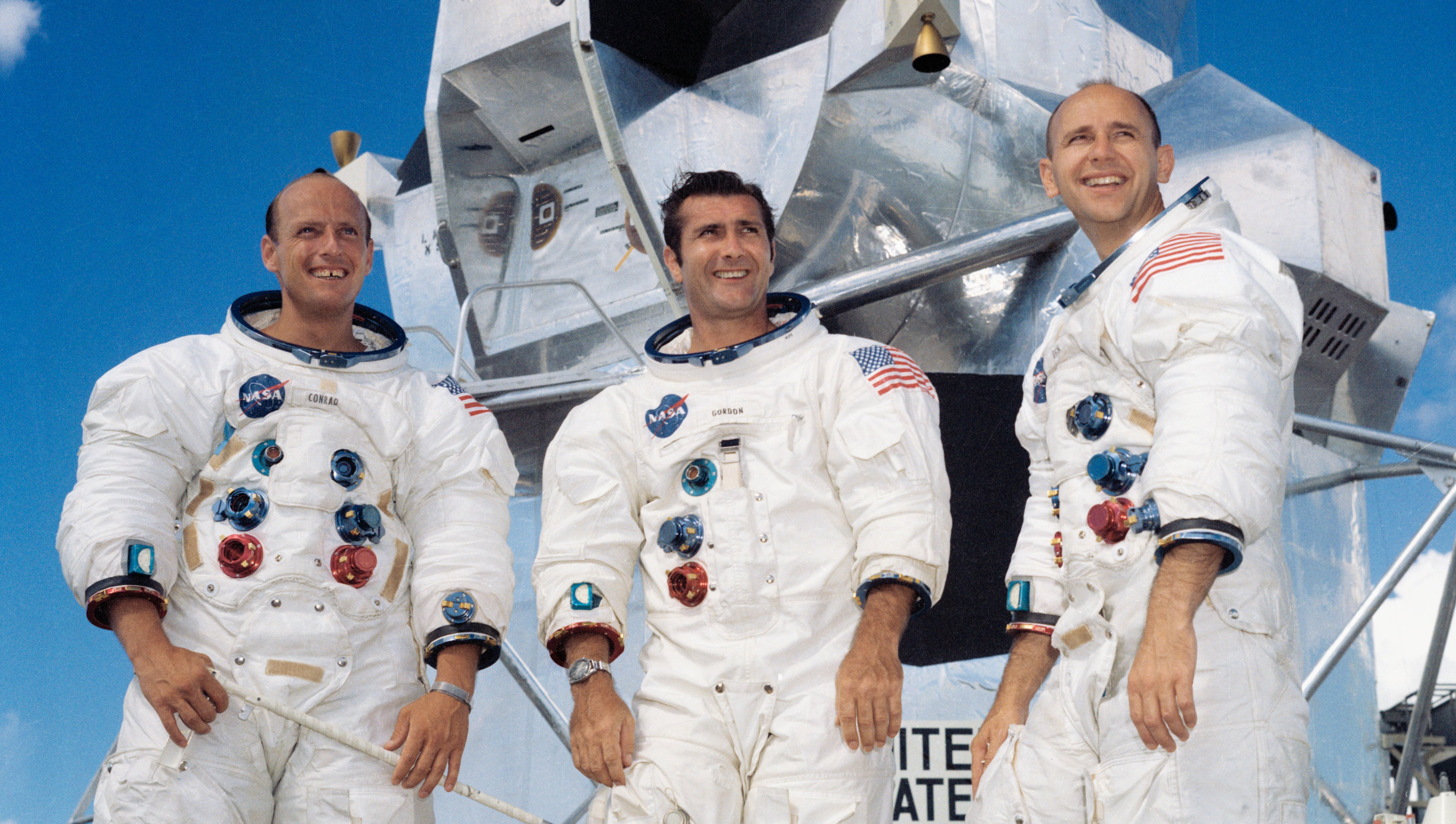
- Left to right: Conrad, Gordon, Bean Apollo program

Apollo 12 (November 14–24, 1969) was the sixth crewed flight in the United States Apollo program and the second to land on the Moon. It was launched on November 14, 1969, by NASA from the Kennedy Space Center in Florida, landing on the part of the Moon called the Ocean of Storms on November 19, 1969. Commander Charles "Pete" Conrad and Lunar Module Pilot Alan L. Bean completed just over one day and seven hours of lunar surface activity while Command Module Pilot Richard F. Gordon remained in lunar orbit.

Apollo 12 would have attempted the first lunar landing had Apollo 11 failed, but after the success of the earlier mission, Apollo 12 was postponed by two months, and other Apollo missions also put on a more relaxed schedule. More time was allotted for geologic training in preparation for Apollo 12 than for Apollo 11, Conrad and Bean making several geology field trips in preparation for their mission. Apollo 12's spacecraft and launch vehicle were almost identical to Apollo 11's. One addition was a set of hammocks, designed to provide Conrad and Bean with a more comfortable resting arrangement inside the Lunar Module during their stay on the Moon.

Shortly after being launched on a rainy day at Kennedy Space Center, Apollo 12 was twice struck by lightning, causing instrumentation problems but little damage. The crew found that switching to the auxiliary power supply resolved the data relay problem, which helped save the mission. The outward journey to the Moon otherwise saw few problems. On November 19, Conrad and Bean achieved a precise landing at their expected location within walking distance of the Surveyor 3 robotic probe, which had landed on April 20, 1967. In making a pinpoint landing, they showed that NASA could plan future missions in the expectation that astronauts could land close to sites of scientific interest. Conrad and Bean carried the Apollo Lunar Surface Experiments Package, a group of nuclear-powered scientific instruments, as well as the first color television camera taken by an Apollo mission to the lunar surface, but transmission was lost after Bean accidentally pointed the camera at the Sun and its sensor was burned out. On the second of two moonwalks, they visited Surveyor 3 and removed parts for return to Earth.

Lunar Module Intrepid lifted off from the Moon on November 20 and docked with the command module, which subsequently traveled back to Earth. The Apollo 12 mission ended on November 24 with a splashdown.

== Crew and key Mission Control personnel ==
Position	Astronaut
Commander	Charles "Pete" Conrad Jr. Third spaceflight
Command Module Pilot	Richard F. Gordon Jr. Second and last spaceflight
Lunar Module Pilot	Alan L. Bean; First spaceflight

The commander of the all-Navy Apollo 12 crew was Charles "Pete" Conrad, who was 39 years old at the time of the mission. After receiving a bachelor's degree in aeronautical engineering from Princeton University in 1953, he became a naval aviator and completed United States Naval Test Pilot School at Patuxent River Naval Air Station. He was selected in the second group of astronauts in 1962 and flew on Gemini 5 in 1965 and as command pilot of Gemini 11 in 1966. Command Module Pilot Richard "Dick" Gordon, 40 years old at the time of Apollo 12, also became a naval aviator in 1953, following graduation from the University of Washington with a degree in chemistry, and completed test pilot school at Patuxent River. Selected as a Group 3 astronaut in 1963, he flew with Conrad on Gemini 11.

The original Lunar Module pilot assigned to work with Conrad was Clifton C. Williams Jr., who was killed in October 1967 when the T-38 he was flying crashed near Tallahassee. When forming his crew, Conrad had wanted Alan L. Bean, a former student of his at the test pilot school, but had been told by Director of Flight Crew Operations Deke Slayton that Bean was unavailable due to an assignment to the Apollo Applications Program. After Williams's death, Conrad asked for Bean again, and this time Slayton yielded. Bean, 37 years old when the mission flew, had graduated from the University of Texas in 1955 with a degree in aeronautical engineering. Also a naval aviator, he was selected alongside Gordon in 1963, and first flew in space on Apollo 12. The three Apollo 12 crew members had backed up Apollo 9 earlier in 1969.

The Apollo 12 backup crew was David R. Scott as commander, Alfred M. Worden as Command Module pilot, and James B. Irwin as Lunar Module pilot. They became the crew of Apollo 15. For Apollo, a third crew of astronauts, known as the support crew, was designated in addition to the prime and backup crews used on projects Mercury and Gemini. Slayton created the support crews because James McDivitt, who would command Apollo 9, believed that, with preparation going on in facilities across the US, meetings that needed a member of the flight crew would be missed. Support crew members were to assist as directed by the mission commander. Usually low in seniority, they assembled the mission's rules, flight plan, and checklists, and kept them updated; For Apollo 12, they were Gerald P. Carr, Edward G. Gibson and Paul J. Weitz. Flight directors were Gerry Griffin, first shift, Pete Frank, second shift, Clifford E. Charlesworth, third shift, and Milton Windler, fourth shift. Flight directors during Apollo had a one-sentence job description, "The flight director may take any actions necessary for crew safety and mission success." Capsule communicators (CAPCOMs) were Scott, Worden, Irwin, Carr, Gibson, Weitz and Don Lind.

== Preparation ==
=== Site selection ===
The landing site selection process for Apollo 12 was greatly informed by the site selection for Apollo 11. There were rigid standards for the possible Apollo 11 landing sites, in which scientific interest was not a major factor: they had to be close to the lunar equator and not on the periphery of the portion of the lunar surface visible from Earth; they had to be relatively flat and without major obstructions along the path the Lunar Module (LM) would fly to reach them, their suitability confirmed by photographs from Lunar Orbiter probes. Also desirable was the presence of another suitable site further west in case the mission was delayed, and the Sun would have risen too high in the sky at the original site for desired lighting conditions. The need for three days to recycle if a launch had to be scrubbed meant that only three of the five suitable sites found were designated as potential landing sites for Apollo 11, of which the Apollo 11 landing site in the Sea of Tranquility was the easternmost. Since Apollo 12 was to attempt the first lunar landing if Apollo 11 failed, both sets of astronauts trained for the same sites.

With the success of Apollo 11, it was initially contemplated that Apollo 12 would land at the site next further west from the Sea of Tranquility, in Sinus Medii. However, NASA planning coordinator Jack Sevier and engineers at the Manned Spaceflight Center at Houston argued for a landing close enough to the crater in which the Surveyor 3 probe had landed in 1967 to allow the astronauts to cut parts from it for return to Earth. The site was otherwise suitable and had scientific interest. Given that Apollo 11 had landed several miles off-target, though, some NASA administrators feared Apollo 12 would land far enough away that the astronauts could not reach the probe, and the agency would be embarrassed. Nevertheless, the ability to perform pinpoint landings was essential if Apollo's exploration program was to be carried out, and on July 25, 1969, Apollo Program Manager Samuel Phillips designated what became known as Surveyor crater as the landing site, despite the unanimous opposition of members of two site selection boards.

To locate Surveyor 3, NASA invited Ewen Whitaker, who together with Gerard Kuiper worked on multiple Moon atlases. Whitaker had found the Surveyor 1 landing site with better precision than NASA. By studying images from Surveyor 3 and comparing them with photographs of thousands of similar craters under the microscope, he identified two rocks near Surveyor 3, that led to the identification of the probe's location.

=== Training and preparation ===
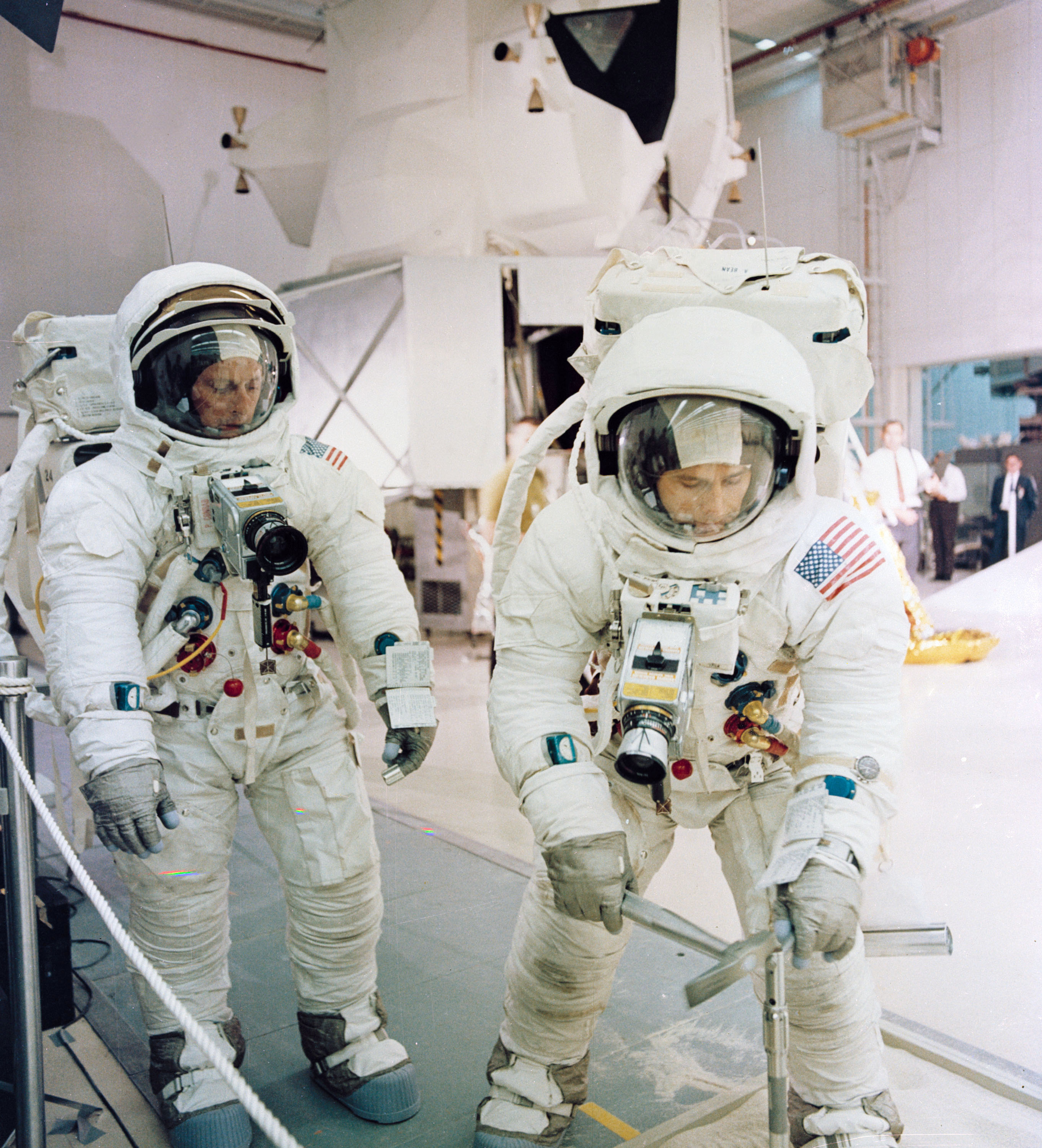
Conrad and Bean rehearse their lunar surface activities before the mission.

The Apollo 12 astronauts spent five hours in mission-specific training for every hour they expected to spend in flight on the mission, a total exceeding 1,000 hours per crew member. Conrad and Bean received more mission-specific training than Apollo 11's Neil Armstrong and Buzz Aldrin had. This was in addition to the 1,500 hours of training they received as backup crew members for Apollo 9. The Apollo 12 training included over 400 hours per crew member in simulators of the Command Module (CM) and of the LM. Some of the simulations were linked in real time to flight controllers in Mission Control. To practice landing on the Moon, Conrad flew the Lunar Landing Training Vehicle (LLTV), which continued to be authorized despite Armstrong having to eject from a similar vehicle in 1968 before it crashed.

Soon after being assigned as Apollo 12 crew commander, Conrad met with NASA geologists and told them that the training for lunar surface activities would be conducted much as Apollo 11's, but there was to be no publicity or involvement by the media. Conrad felt he had been abused by the press during Gemini, and the sole Apollo 11 geology field trip had turned into a near-fiasco, with a large media contingent present, some getting in the way—the astronauts had trouble hearing each other due to a hovering press helicopter. After the return of Apollo 11 in July 1969, more time was allotted for geology, but the astronauts' focus was on getting time in the simulators without being preempted by the Apollo 11 crew. On the six Apollo 12 geology field trips, the astronauts would practice as if on the Moon, collecting samples and documenting them with photographs, while communicating with a CAPCOM and geologists who were out of sight in a nearby tent. Afterwards, the astronauts' performance in choosing samples and taking photographs would be critiqued. To the frustration of the astronauts, the scientists kept changing the photo documentation procedures; after the fourth or fifth such change, Conrad required that there be no more. After the return of Apollo 11, the Apollo 12 crew was able to view the lunar samples, and be briefed on them by scientists.

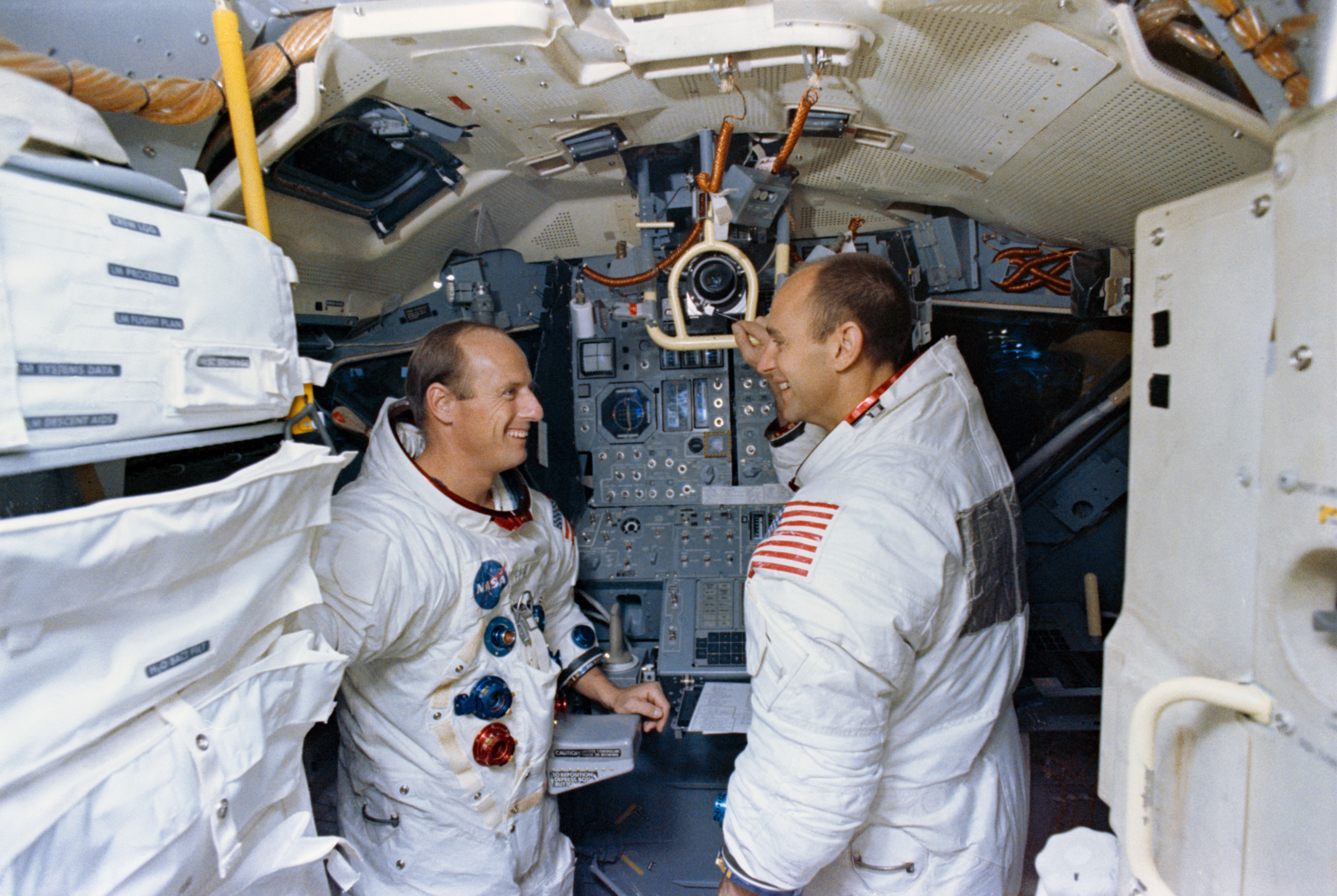
Conrad and Bean in the LM simulator

As Apollo 11 was targeted for an ellipse-shaped landing zone, rather than at a specific point, there was no planning for geology traverses, the designated tasks to be done at sites of the crew's choosing. For Apollo 12, before the mission, some of NASA's geology team met with the crew and Conrad suggested they lay out possible routes for him and Bean. The result was four traverses, based on four potential landing points for the LM. This was the start of geology traverse planning that on later missions became a considerable effort involving several organizations.

The stages of the lunar module, LM–6, were delivered to Kennedy Space Center (KSC) on March 24, 1969, and were mated to each other on April 28. Command module CM–108 and service module SM–108 were delivered to KSC on March 28, and were mated to each other on April 21. Following installation of gear and testing, the launch vehicle, with the spacecraft atop it, was rolled out to Launch Complex 39A on September 8, 1969. The training schedule was complete, as planned, by November 1, 1969; activities after that date were intended as refreshers. The crew members felt that the training, for the most part, was adequate preparation for the Moon mission.

== Hardware ==
=== Launch vehicle ===
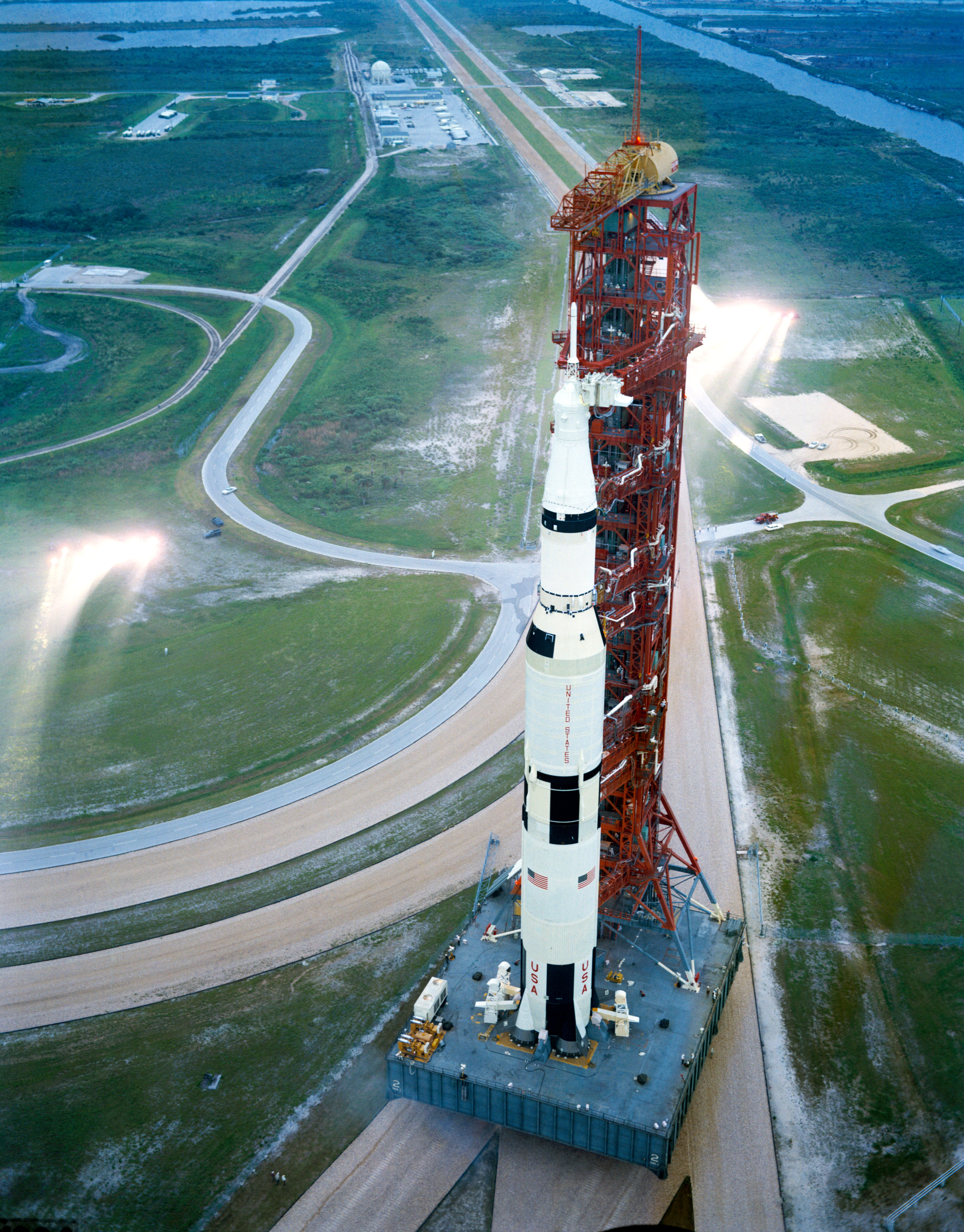
SA-507 en route to the launch pad, September 1969

There were no significant changes to the Saturn V launch vehicle used on Apollo 12, SA–507, from that used on Apollo 11. There were another 17 instrumentation measurements in the Apollo 12 launch vehicle, bringing the number to 1,365. The entire vehicle, including the spacecraft, weighed 6,487,742 pounds (2,942,790 kg) at launch, an increase from Apollo 11's 6,477,875 pounds (2,938,315 kg). Of this figure, the spacecraft weighed 110,044 pounds (49,915 kg), up from 109,646 pounds (49,735 kg) on Apollo 11.

==== Third stage trajectory ====
After LM separation, the third stage of the Saturn V, the S-IVB, was intended to fly into solar orbit. The S-IVB auxiliary propulsion system was fired, with the intent that the Moon's gravity would slingshot the stage into solar orbit. Due to an error, the S-IVB flew past the Moon at too high an altitude to achieve Earth escape velocity. It remained in a semi-stable Earth orbit until it finally escaped Earth orbit in 1971, but briefly returned to Earth orbit 31 years later. It was discovered by amateur astronomer Bill Yeung who gave it the temporary designation J002E3 before it was determined to be an artificial object. Again in solar orbit as of 2021, it may again be captured by Earth's gravity, but not at least until the 2040s. The S-IVBs used on later lunar missions were deliberately crashed into the Moon to create seismic events that would register on the seismometers left on the Moon and provide data about the Moon's structure.

=== Spacecraft ===
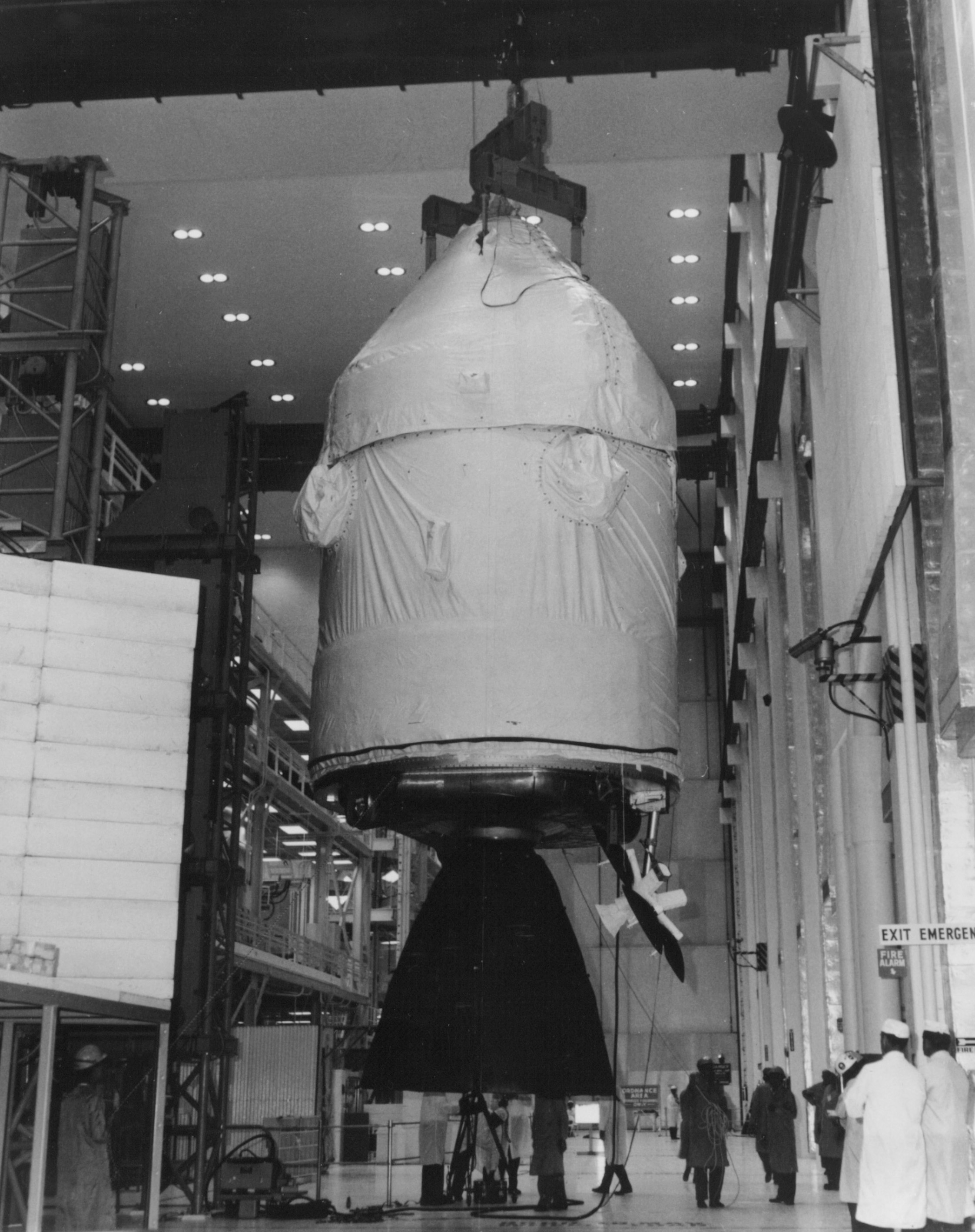
The Apollo 12 CSM on a test stand, June 30, 1969

The Apollo 12 spacecraft consisted of Command Module 108 and Service Module 108 (together Command and Service Modules 108, or CSM–108), Lunar Module 6 (LM–6), a Launch Escape System (LES), and Spacecraft-Lunar Module Adapter 15 (SLA–15). The LES contained three rocket motors to propel the CM to safety in the event of an abort shortly after launch, while the SLA housed the LM and provided a structural connection between the Saturn V and the LM. The SLA was identical to Apollo 11's, while the LES differed only in the installation of a more reliable motor igniter.

The CSM was given the call sign Yankee Clipper, while the LM had the call sign Intrepid. These sea-related names were selected by the all-Navy crew from several thousand proposed names submitted by employees of the prime contractors of the respective modules. George Glacken, a flight test engineer at North American Aviation, builder of the CSM, proposed Yankee Clipper as such ships had "majestically sailed the high seas with pride and prestige for a new America". Intrepid was from a suggestion by Robert Lambert, a planner at Grumman, builder of the LM, as evocative of "this nation's resolute determination for continued exploration of space, stressing our astronauts' fortitude and endurance of hardship".

The differences between the CSM and LM of Apollo 11, and those of Apollo 12, were few and minor. A hydrogen separator was added to the CSM to stop the gas from entering the potable water tank—Apollo 11 had had one, though mounted on the water dispenser in the CM's cabin. Gaseous hydrogen in the water had given the Apollo 11 crew severe flatulence. Other changes included the strengthening of the recovery loop attached following splashdown, meaning that the swimmers recovering the CM would not have to attach an auxiliary loop. LM changes included a structural modification so that scientific experiment packages could be carried for deployment on the lunar surface. Two hammocks were added for greater comfort of the astronauts while resting on the Moon, and a color television camera substituted for the black and white one used on the lunar surface during Apollo 11.

=== ALSEP ===
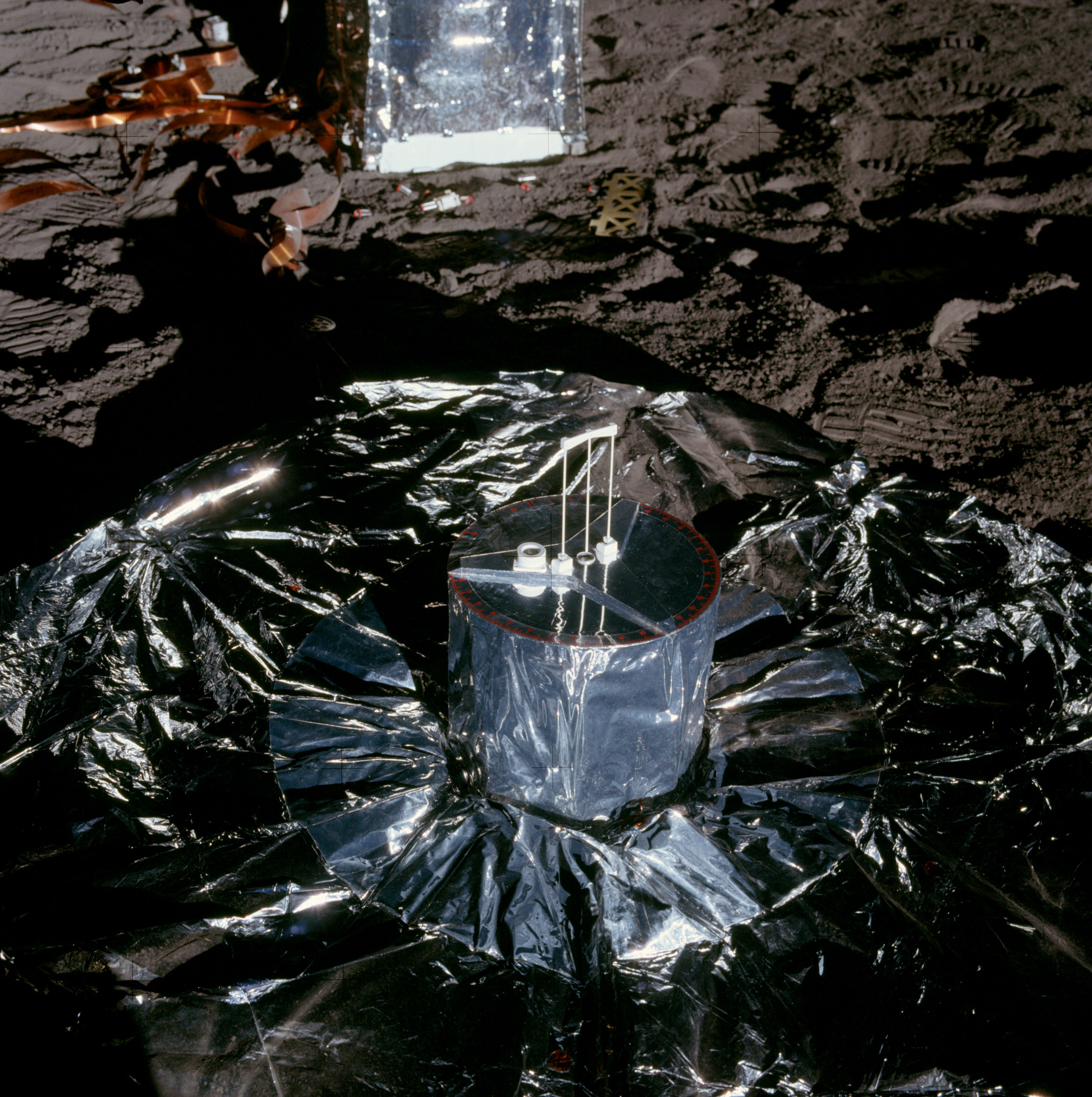
Apollo 12's Passive Seismic Experiment

The Apollo Lunar Surface Experiments Package (ALSEP) was a suite of scientific instruments designed to be emplaced on the lunar surface by the Apollo astronauts, and thereafter operate autonomously, sending data to Earth. Development of the ALSEP was part of NASA's response to some scientists who opposed the crewed lunar landing program (they felt that robotic craft could explore the Moon more cheaply) by demonstrating that some tasks, such as deployment of the ALSEP, required humans. In 1966, a contract to design and build the ALSEPs was awarded to the Bendix Corporation. Due to the limited time the Apollo 11 crew would have on the lunar surface, a smaller suite of experiments was flown, known as the Early Apollo Surface Experiment Package (EASEP). Apollo 12 was the first mission to carry an ALSEP; one would be flown on each of the subsequent lunar landing missions, though the components that were included would vary. Apollo 12's ALSEP was to be deployed at least 300 feet (91 m) away from the LM to protect the instruments from the debris that would be generated when the ascent stage of the LM took off to return the astronauts to lunar orbit.

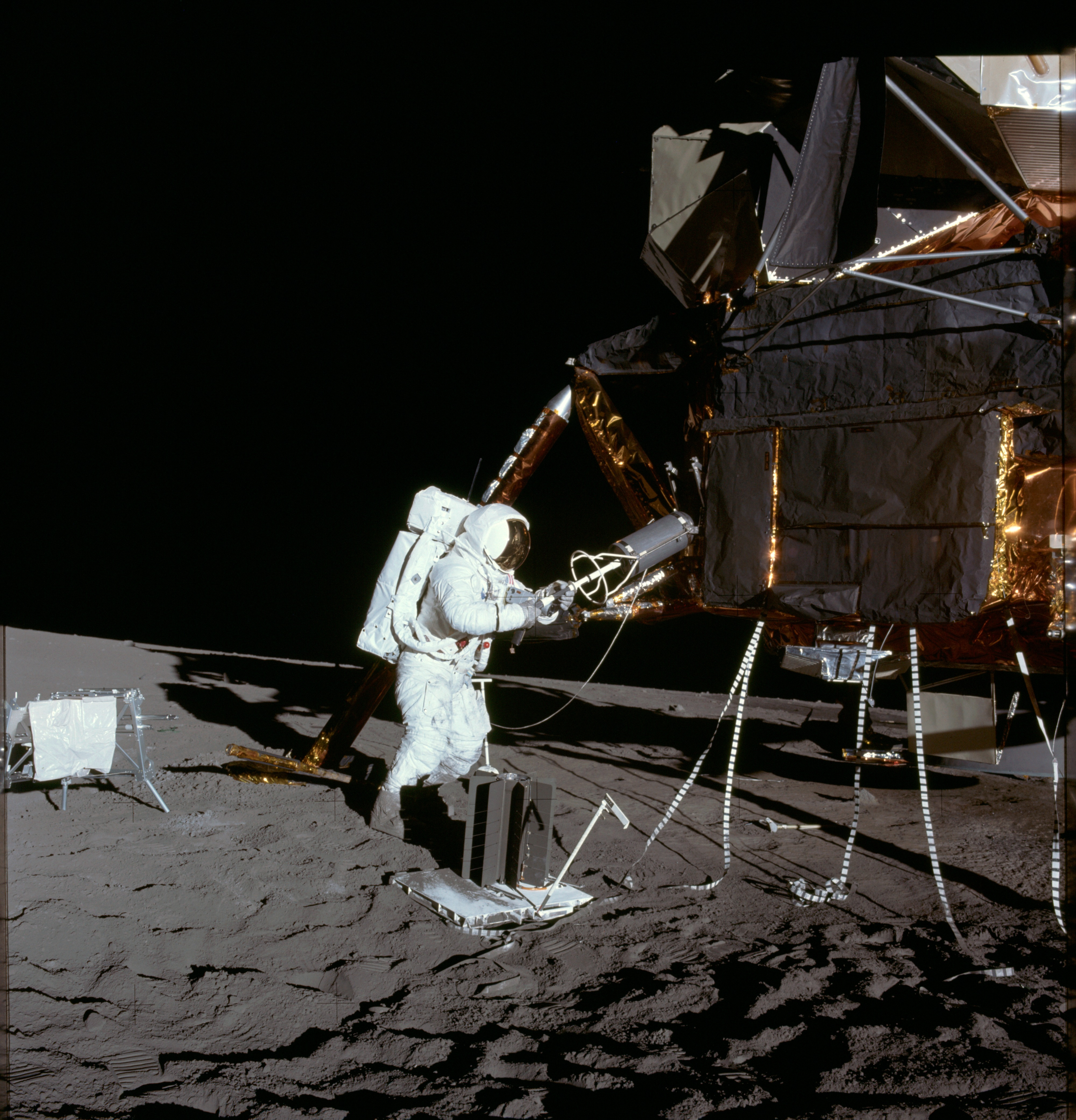
Bean places the fuel element into the SNAP-27 RTG.

Apollo 12's ALSEP included a Lunar Surface Magnetometer (LSM), to measure the magnetic field at the Moon's surface, a Lunar Atmosphere Detector (LAD, also known as the Cold Cathode Gauge Experiment), intended to measure the density and temperature of the thin lunar atmosphere and how it varies, a Lunar Ionosphere Detector (LID, also known as the Suprathermal Ion Detector Experiment, or SIDE), intended to study the charged particles in the lunar atmosphere, and the Solar Wind Spectrometer, to measure the strength and direction of the solar wind at the Moon's surface—the free-standing Solar Wind Composition Experiment, to measure what makes up the solar wind, would be deployed and then brought back to Earth by the astronauts. A Dust Detector was used to measure the accumulation of lunar dust on the equipment. Apollo 12's Passive Seismic Experiment (PSE), a seismometer, would measure moonquakes and other movements in the Moon's crust, and would be calibrated by the nearby planned impact of the ascent stage of Apollo 12's LM, an object of known mass and velocity hitting the Moon at a known location, and projected to be equivalent to the explosive force of one ton of TNT.

The ALSEP experiments left on the Moon by Apollo 12 were connected to a Central Station, which contained a transmitter, receiver, timer, data processor, and equipment for power distribution and control of the experiments. The equipment was powered by SNAP-27, a radioisotope thermoelectric generator (RTG) developed by the Atomic Energy Commission. Containing plutonium, the RTG flown on Apollo 12 was the first use of atomic energy on a crewed NASA spacecraft—some NASA and military satellites had previously used similar systems. The plutonium core was brought from Earth in a cask attached to an LM landing leg, a container designed to survive re-entry in the event of an aborted mission, something NASA considered unlikely. The cask would survive re-entry on Apollo 13, sinking in the Tonga Trench of the Pacific Ocean, apparently without radioactive leakage.

The Apollo 12 ALSEP experiments were activated from Earth on November 19, 1969. The LAD returned only a small amount of useful data due to the failure of its power supply soon after activation. The LSM was deactivated on June 14, 1974, as was the other LSM deployed on the Moon, from Apollo 15. All powered ALSEP experiments that remained active were deactivated on September 30, 1977, principally because of budgetary constraints.

== Mission highlights ==
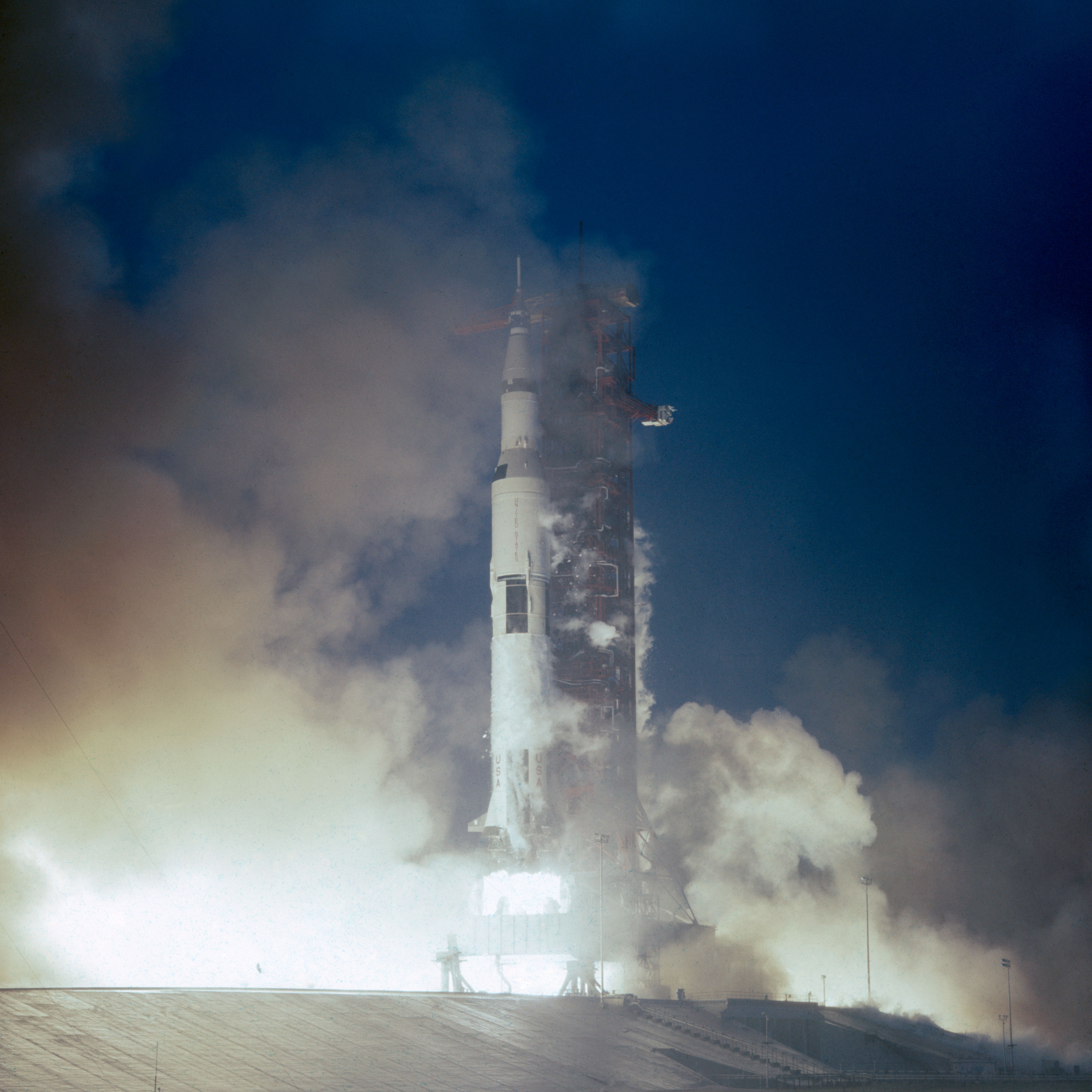
Apollo 12 launches from Kennedy Space Center, November 14, 1969

=== Launch ===
With President Richard Nixon in attendance, the first time a sitting U.S. president had witnessed a crewed space launch, as well as Vice President Spiro Agnew, Apollo 12 launched as planned on November 14, 1969, from the Kennedy Space Center at 16:22:00 UTC (11:22 am EST, local time at the launch site). This was at the start of a launch window of three hours and four minutes to reach the Moon with optimal lighting conditions at the planned landing point. There were completely overcast rainy skies, and the vehicle encountered winds of 151.7 knots (280.9 km/h; 174.6 mph) during ascent, the strongest of any Apollo mission. There was a NASA rule against launching into a cumulonimbus cloud; this had been waived and it was later determined that the launch vehicle never entered such a cloud. Had the mission been postponed, it could have been launched on November 16 with landing at a backup site where there would be no Surveyor, but since time pressure to achieve a lunar landing had been removed by Apollo 11's success, NASA might have waited until December for the next opportunity to go to the Surveyor crater.

Lightning struck the Saturn V 36.5 seconds after lift-off, triggered by the vehicle itself. The static discharge caused a voltage transient that knocked all three fuel cells offline, meaning the spacecraft was being powered entirely from its batteries, which could not supply enough current to meet demand. A second strike at 52 seconds knocked out the "8-ball" attitude indicator. The telemetry stream at Mission Control was garbled, but the Saturn V continued to fly normally; the strikes had not affected the Saturn V instrument unit guidance system, which functioned independently from the CSM. The astronauts unexpectedly had a board red with caution and warning lights, but could not tell exactly what was wrong.

The Electrical, Environmental and Consumables Manager (EECOM) in Mission Control, John Aaron, remembered the telemetry failure pattern from an earlier test when a power loss caused a malfunction in the CSM signal conditioning electronics (SCE), which converted raw signals from instrumentation to data that could be displayed on Mission Control's consoles, and knew how to fix it. Aaron made a call, "Flight, EECOM. Try SCE to Aux", to switch the SCE to a backup power supply. The switch was fairly obscure, and neither Flight Director Gerald Griffin, CAPCOM Gerald P. Carr, nor Conrad knew what it was; Bean, who as LMP was the spacecraft's engineer, knew where to find it and threw the switch, after which the telemetry came back online, revealing no significant malfunctions. Bean put the fuel cells back online, and the mission continued. Once in Earth parking orbit, the crew carefully checked out their spacecraft before re-igniting the S-IVB third stage for trans-lunar injection. The lightning strikes caused no serious permanent damage.

Initially, it was feared that the lightning strike could have damaged the explosive bolts that opened the Command Module's parachute compartment. The decision was made not to share this with the astronauts and to continue with the flight plan, since they would die if the parachutes failed to deploy, whether following an Earth-orbit abort or upon a return from the Moon, so nothing was to be gained by aborting. The parachutes deployed and functioned normally at the end of the mission.

=== Outward journey ===
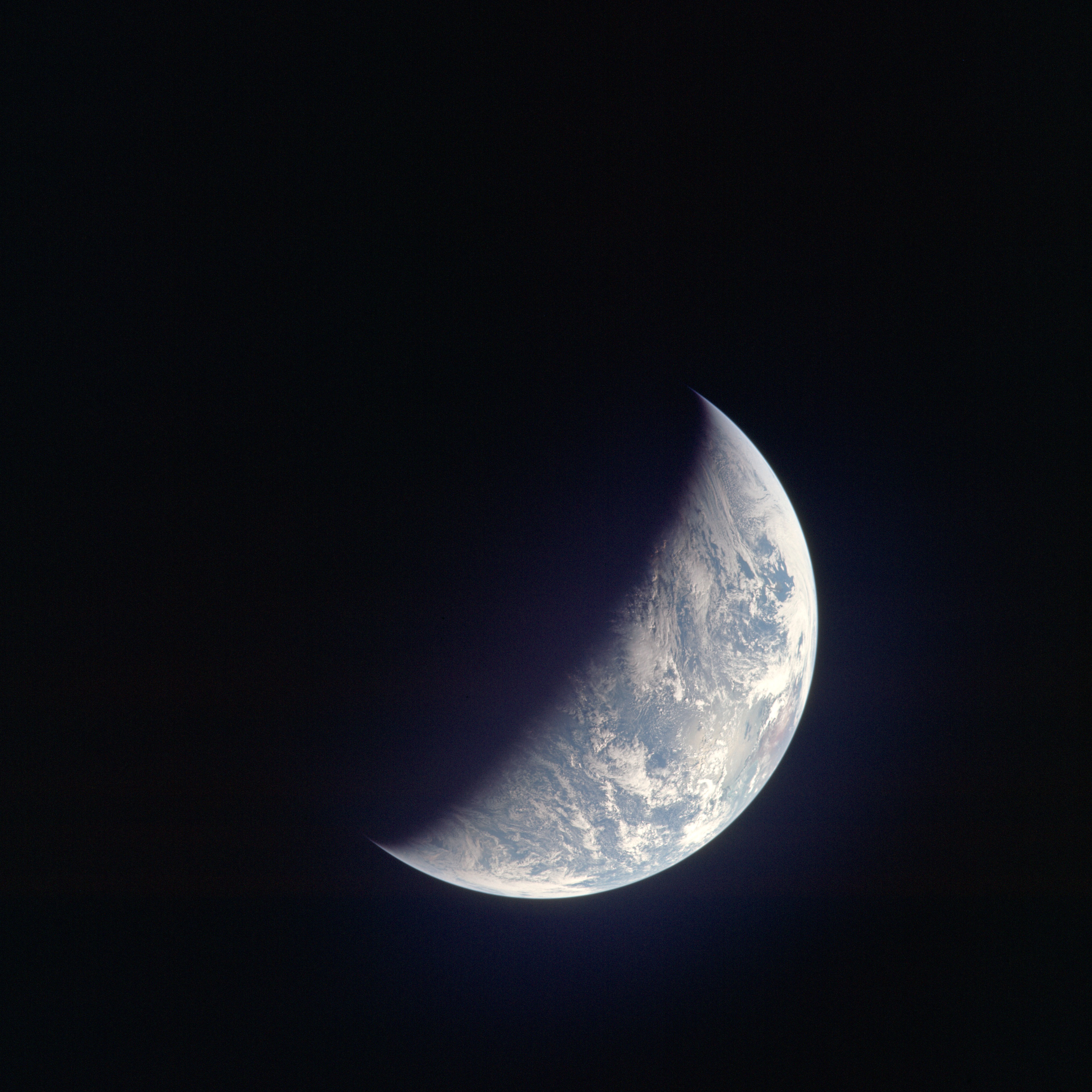
View of Earth taken en route to the Moon

After systems checks in Earth orbit, performed with great care because of the lightning strikes, the trans-lunar injection burn, made with the S-IVB, took place at 02:47:22.80 into the mission, setting Apollo 12 on course for the Moon. An hour and twenty minutes later, the CSM separated from the S-IVB, after which Gordon performed the transposition, docking, and extraction maneuver to dock with the LM and separate the combined craft from the S-IVB, which was then sent on an attempt to reach solar orbit. The stage fired its engines to leave the vicinity of the spacecraft, a change from Apollo 11, where the SM's Service Propulsion System (SPS) engine was used to distance it from the S-IVB.

As there were concerns the LM might have been damaged by the lightning strikes, Conrad and Bean entered it on the first day of flight to check its status, earlier than planned. They found no issues. At 30:52.44.36, the only necessary midcourse correction during the translunar coast was made, placing the craft on a hybrid, non-free-return trajectory. Previous crewed missions to lunar orbit had taken a free-return trajectory, allowing an easy return to Earth if the craft's engines did not fire to enter lunar orbit. Apollo 12 was the first crewed spacecraft to take a hybrid free-return trajectory, that would require another burn to return to Earth, but one that could be executed by the LM's Descent Propulsion System (DPS) if the SPS failed. The use of a hybrid trajectory allowed more flexibility in mission planning. It for example allowed Apollo 12 to launch in daylight and reach the planned landing spot on schedule. Use of a hybrid trajectory meant that Apollo 12 took 8 hours longer to go from trans-lunar injection to lunar orbit.

=== Lunar orbit and Moon landing ===
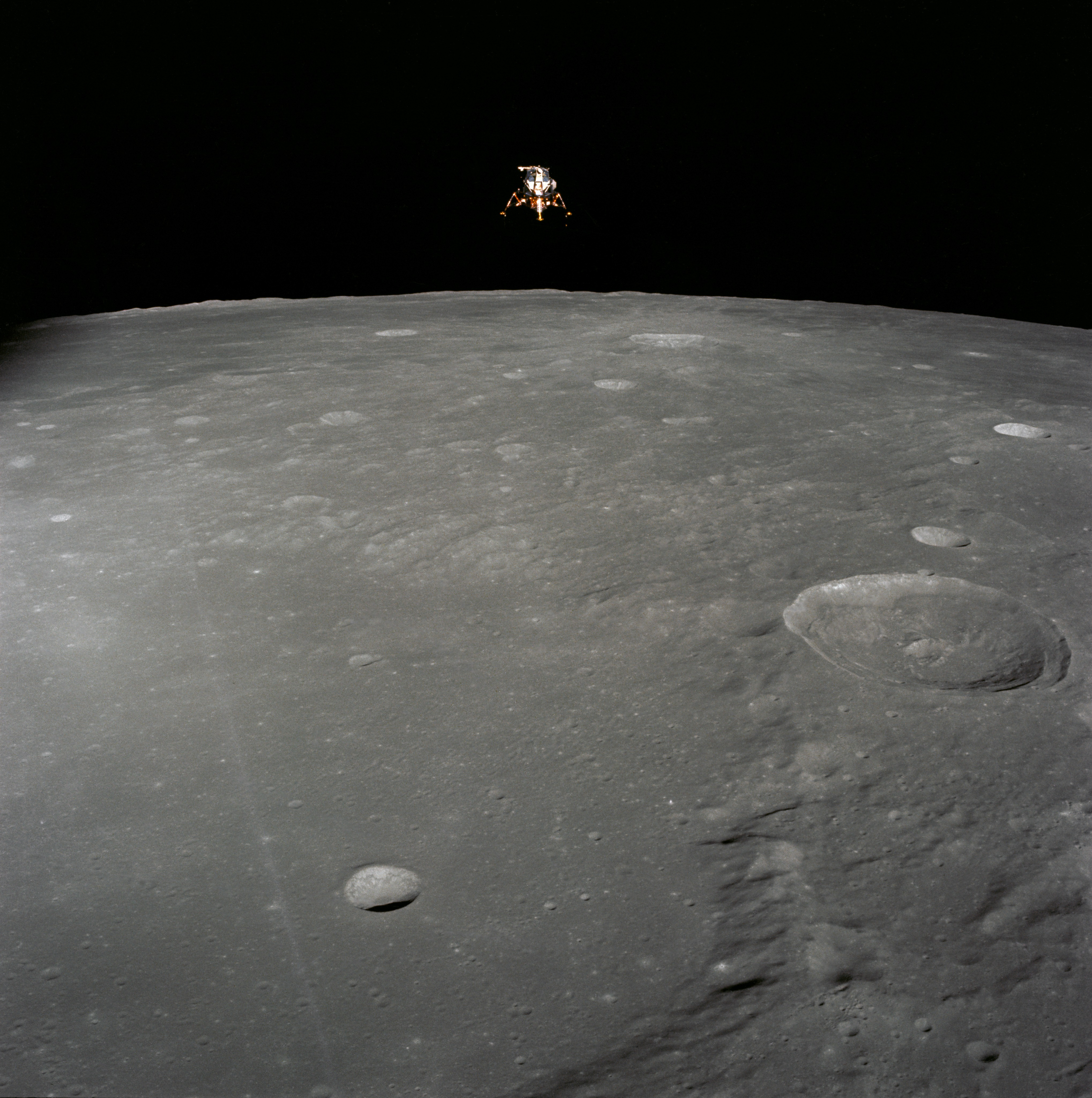
Lunar Module Intrepid above the Moon. The small crater in the foreground is Ammonius; the large crater at right is Herschel. Photograph by Richard F. Gordon Jr. on board the Command Module Yankee Clipper.

Apollo 12 entered a lunar orbit of 170.2 by 61.66 nautical miles (315.2 by 114.2 km; 195.9 by 70.96 mi) with an SPS burn of 352.25 seconds at mission time 83:25:26.36. On the first lunar orbit, there was a television transmission that resulted in good-quality video of the lunar surface. On the third lunar orbit, there was another burn to circularize the craft's orbit to 66.1 by 54.59 nautical miles (122.4 by 101.1 km; 76.07 by 62.82 mi), and on the next revolution, preparations began for the lunar landing. The CSM and LM undocked at 107:54:02.3; a half hour later there was a burn by the CSM to separate them. The 14.4 second burn by some of the CSM's thrusters meant that the two craft would be 2.2 nautical miles (4.1 km; 2.5 mi) apart when the LM began the burn to move to a lower orbit in preparation for landing on the Moon.

The LM's Descent Propulsion System began a 29-second burn at 109:23:39.9 to move the craft to the lower orbit, from which the 717-second powered descent to the lunar surface began at 110:20:38.1. Conrad had trained to expect a pattern of craters known as "the Snowman" to be visible when the craft underwent "pitchover", with the Surveyor crater in its center, but had feared he would see nothing recognizable. He was astonished to see the Snowman right where it should be, meaning they were directly on course. He took over manual control, planning to land the LM, as he had in simulations, in an area near the Surveyor crater that had been dubbed "Pete's Parking Lot", but found it rougher than expected. He had to maneuver, and landed the LM at 110:32:36.2 (06:54:36 UTC on November 19, 1969), just 535 feet (163 m) from the Surveyor probe. This achieved one objective of the mission, to perform a precision landing near the Surveyor craft.

The lunar coordinates of the landing site were 3.01239° S latitude, 23.42157° W longitude. The landing caused high velocity sandblasting of the Surveyor probe. It was later determined that the sandblasting removed more dust than it delivered onto the Surveyor, because the probe was covered by a thin layer that gave it a tan hue as observed by the astronauts, and every portion of the surface exposed to the direct sandblasting was lightened back toward the original white color through the removal of lunar dust.

=== Lunar surface activities ===
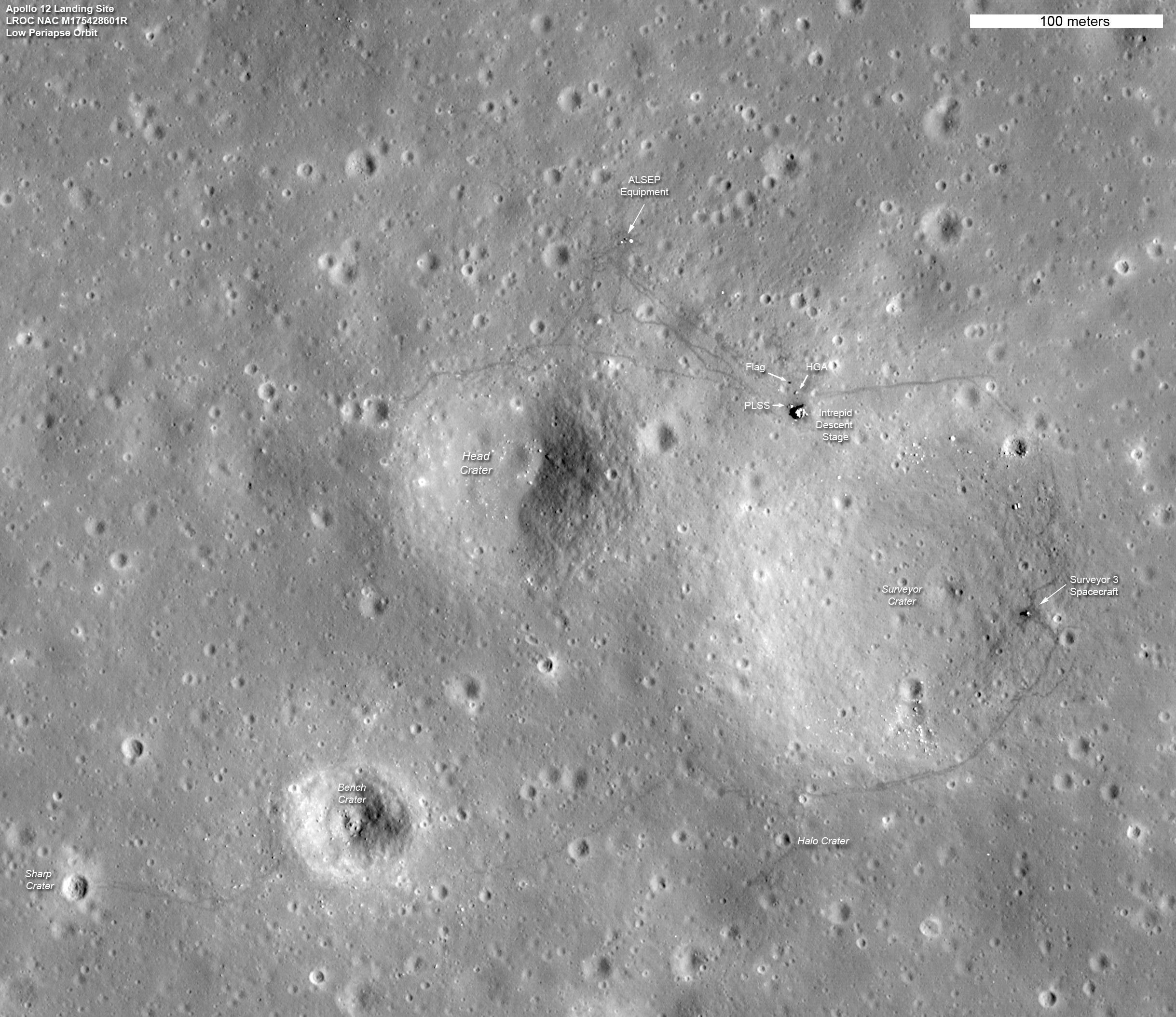
Aerial view of Statio Cognitum of Apollo 12; the Lunar Module descent stage, Surveyor 3, and other equipment and local craters are labeled (click to enlarge). The astronauts' footprints are still visible.

When Conrad, the shortest man of the initial groups of astronauts, stepped onto the lunar surface his first words were "Whoopie! Man, that may have been a small one for Neil, but that's a long one for me." This was not an off-the-cuff remark: Conrad had made a US$500 bet with reporter Oriana Fallaci he would say these words, after she had queried whether NASA had instructed Neil Armstrong what to say as he stepped onto the Moon. Conrad later said he was never able to collect the money.

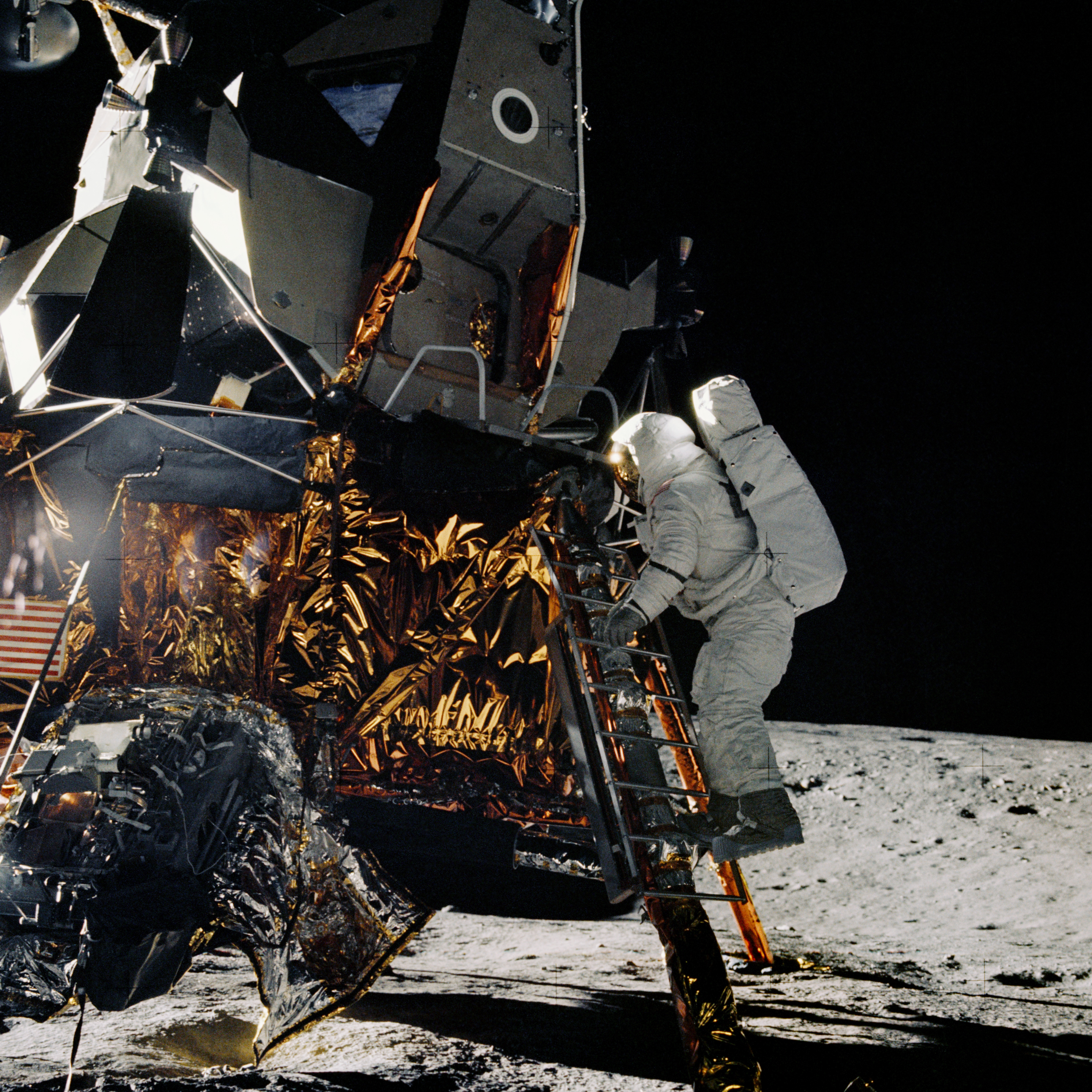
Bean prepares to step onto the lunar surface.

To improve the quality of television pictures from the Moon, a color camera was carried on Apollo 12 (unlike the monochrome camera on Apollo 11). When Bean carried the camera to the place near the LM where it was to be set up, he inadvertently pointed it directly into the Sun, destroying the Secondary Electron Conduction (SEC) tube. Television coverage of this mission was thus terminated almost immediately.

After raising a U.S. flag on the Moon, Conrad and Bean devoted much of the remainder of the first EVA to deploying the Apollo Lunar Surface Experiments Package (ALSEP). There were minor difficulties with the deployment. Bean had trouble extracting the RTG's plutonium fuel element from its protective cask, and the astronauts had to resort to the use of a hammer to hit the cask and dislodge the fuel element. Some of the ALSEP packages proved hard to deploy, though the astronauts were successful in all cases. With the PSE able to detect their footprints as they headed back to the LM, the astronauts secured a core tube full of lunar material, and collected other samples. The first EVA lasted 3 hours, 56 minutes and 3 seconds.

Four possible geologic traverses had been planned, the variable being where the LM might set down. Conrad had landed it between two of these potential landing points, and during the first EVA and the rest break that followed, scientists in Houston combined two of the traverses into one that Conrad and Bean could follow from their landing point. The resultant traverse resembled a rough circle, and when the astronauts emerged from the LM some 13 hours after ending the first EVA, the first stop was Head crater, some 100 yards (91 m) from the LM. There, Bean noticed that Conrad's footprints showed lighter material underneath, indicating the presence of ejecta from Copernicus crater, 230 miles (370 km) to the north, something that scientists examining overhead photographs of the site had hoped to find. After the mission, samples from Head allowed geologists to date the impact that formed Copernicus—according to initial dating, some 810 million years ago.

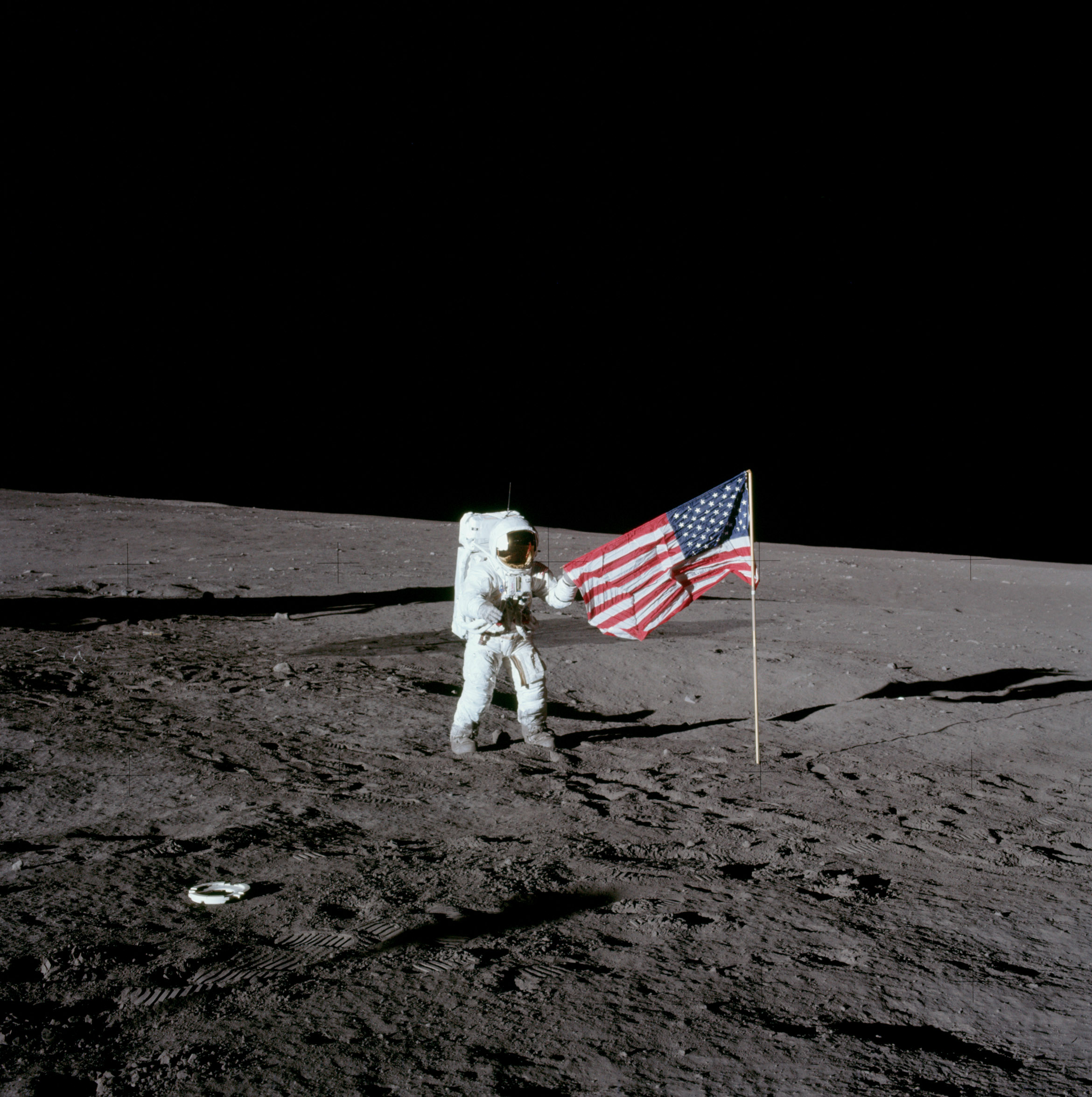
Conrad with the U.S. flag

The astronauts proceeded to Bench crater and Sharp crater and past Halo crater before arriving at Surveyor crater, where the Surveyor 3 probe had landed. Fearing treacherous footing or that the probe might topple on them, they approached Surveyor cautiously, descending into the shallow crater some distance away and then following a contour to reach the craft, but found the footing solid and the probe stable. They collected several pieces of Surveyor, including the television camera, as well as taking rocks that had been studied by television. Conrad and Bean had procured an automatic timer for their Hasselblad cameras, and had brought it with them without telling Mission Control, hoping to take a selfie of the two of them with the probe, but when the time came to use it, could not locate it among the lunar samples they had already placed in their Hand Tool Carrier. Before returning to the LM's vicinity, Conrad and Bean went to Block crater, within Surveyor crater. The second EVA lasted 3 hours, 49 minutes, 15 seconds, during which they traveled 4,300 feet (1,300 m). During the EVAs, Conrad and Bean went as far as 1,350 feet (410 m) from the LM, and collected 73.75 pounds (33.45 kg) of samples.

=== Lunar orbit solo activities ===
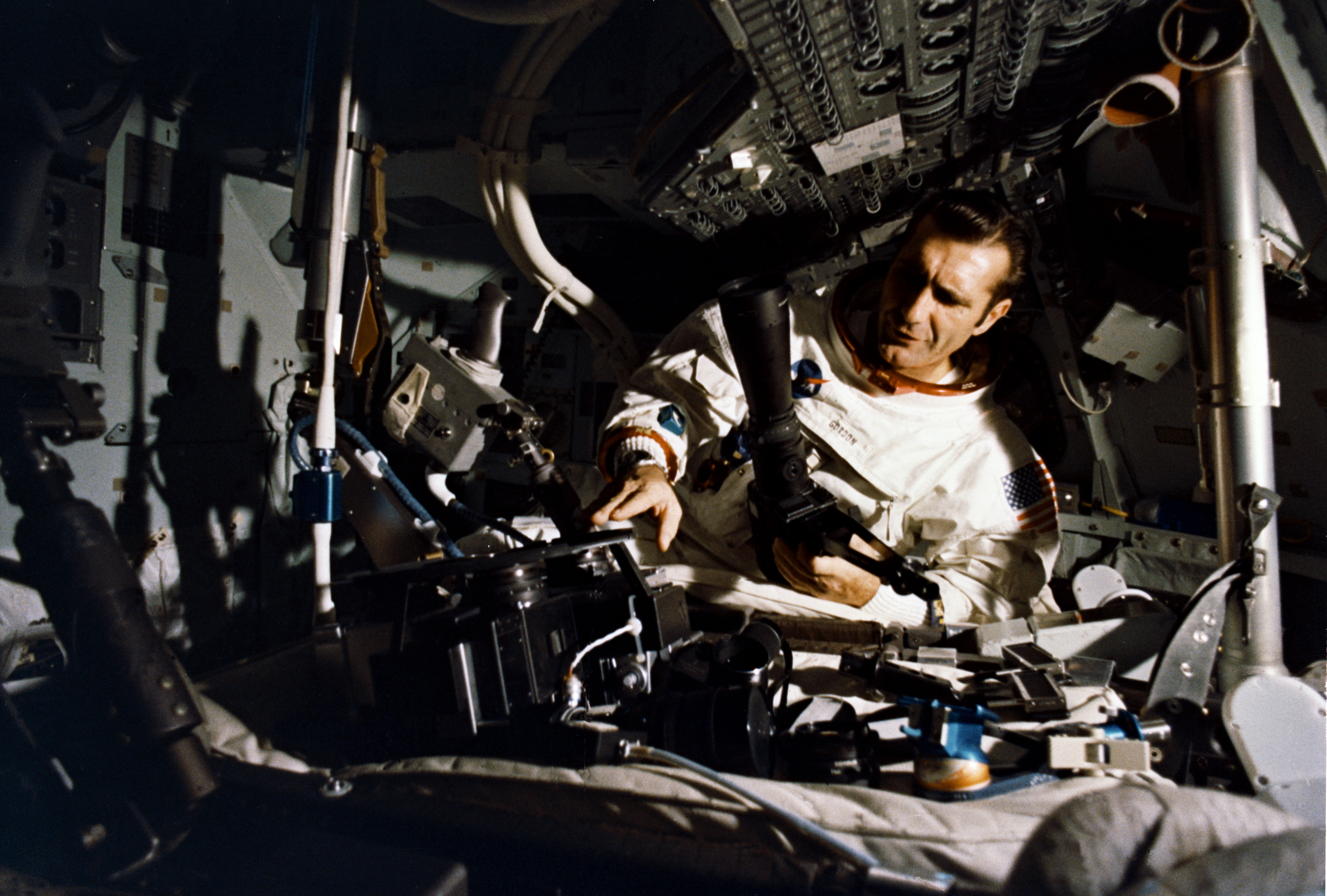
Gordon in the CM simulator

After the LM's departure, Gordon had little to say as Mission Control focused on the lunar landing. Once that was accomplished, Gordon sent his congratulations and, on the next orbit, was able to spot both the LM and the Surveyor on the ground and convey their locations to Houston. During the first EVA, Gordon prepared for a plane change maneuver, a burn to alter the CSM's orbit to compensate for the rotation of the Moon, though at times he had difficulty communicating with Houston since Conrad and Bean were using the same communications circuit. Once the two moonwalkers had returned to the LM, Gordon executed the burn, which ensured he would be in the proper position to rendezvous with the LM when it launched from the Moon.

While alone in orbit, Gordon performed the Lunar Multispectral Photography Experiment, using four Hasselblad cameras arranged in a ring and aimed through one of the CM's windows. With each camera having a different color filter, simultaneous photos would be taken by each, showing the appearance of lunar features at different points on the spectrum. Analysis of the images might reveal colors not visible to the naked eye or detectable with ordinary color film, and information could be obtained about the composition of sites that would not soon be visited by humans. Among the sites studied were contemplated landing points for future Apollo missions.

=== Return ===
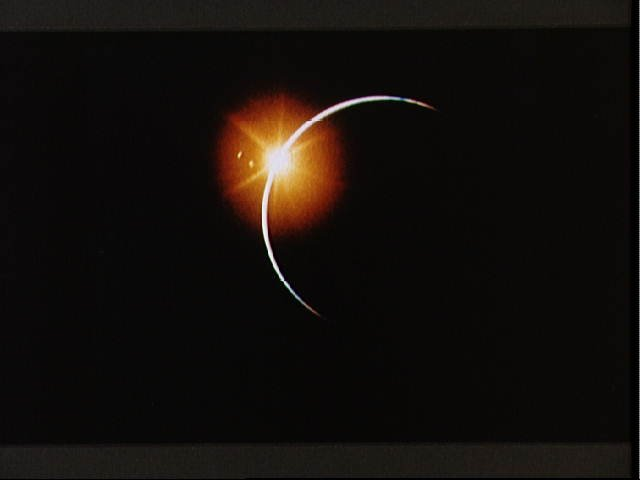
A solar eclipse seen from Apollo 12

LM Intrepid lifted off from the Moon at mission time 143:03:47.78, or 14:25:47 UTC on November 20, 1969; after several maneuvers, CSM and LM docked three and a half hours later. At 147:59:31.6, the LM ascent stage was jettisoned, and shortly thereafter the CSM maneuvered away. Under control from Earth, the LM's remaining propellant was depleted in a burn that caused it to impact the Moon 39 nautical miles (72 km; 45 mi) from the Apollo 12 landing point. The seismometer the astronauts had left on the lunar surface registered the resulting vibrations for more than an hour.

The crew stayed another day in lunar orbit taking photographs of the surface, including of candidate sites for future Apollo landings. A second plane change maneuver was made at 159:04:45.47, lasting 19.25 seconds.

The trans-Earth injection burn, to send the CSM Yankee Clipper towards home, was conducted at 172:27:16.81 and lasted 130.32 seconds. Two short midcourse correction burns were made en route. A final television broadcast was made, the astronauts answering questions submitted by the media. There was ample time for rest on the way back to Earth. One event was the photography of a solar eclipse that occurred when the Earth came between the spacecraft and the Sun; Bean described it as the most spectacular sight of the mission.

=== Splashdown ===
Yankee Clipper returned to Earth on November 24, 1969, splashing down in the South Pacific Ocean southeast of Samoa at 244:36:25 (20:58:24 UTC, 10:58:24 am HST, local time at the landing site). The landing was hard, resulting in a camera becoming dislodged and striking Bean in the forehead. After recovery by USS Hornet, they entered the Mobile Quarantine Facility (MQF), while lunar samples and Surveyor parts were sent ahead by air to the Lunar Receiving Laboratory (LRL) in Houston. Once the Hornet docked in Hawaii, the MQF was offloaded and flown to Ellington Air Force Base near Houston on November 29, from where it was taken to the LRL, where the astronauts remained until released from quarantine on December 10.

== Mission insignia ==
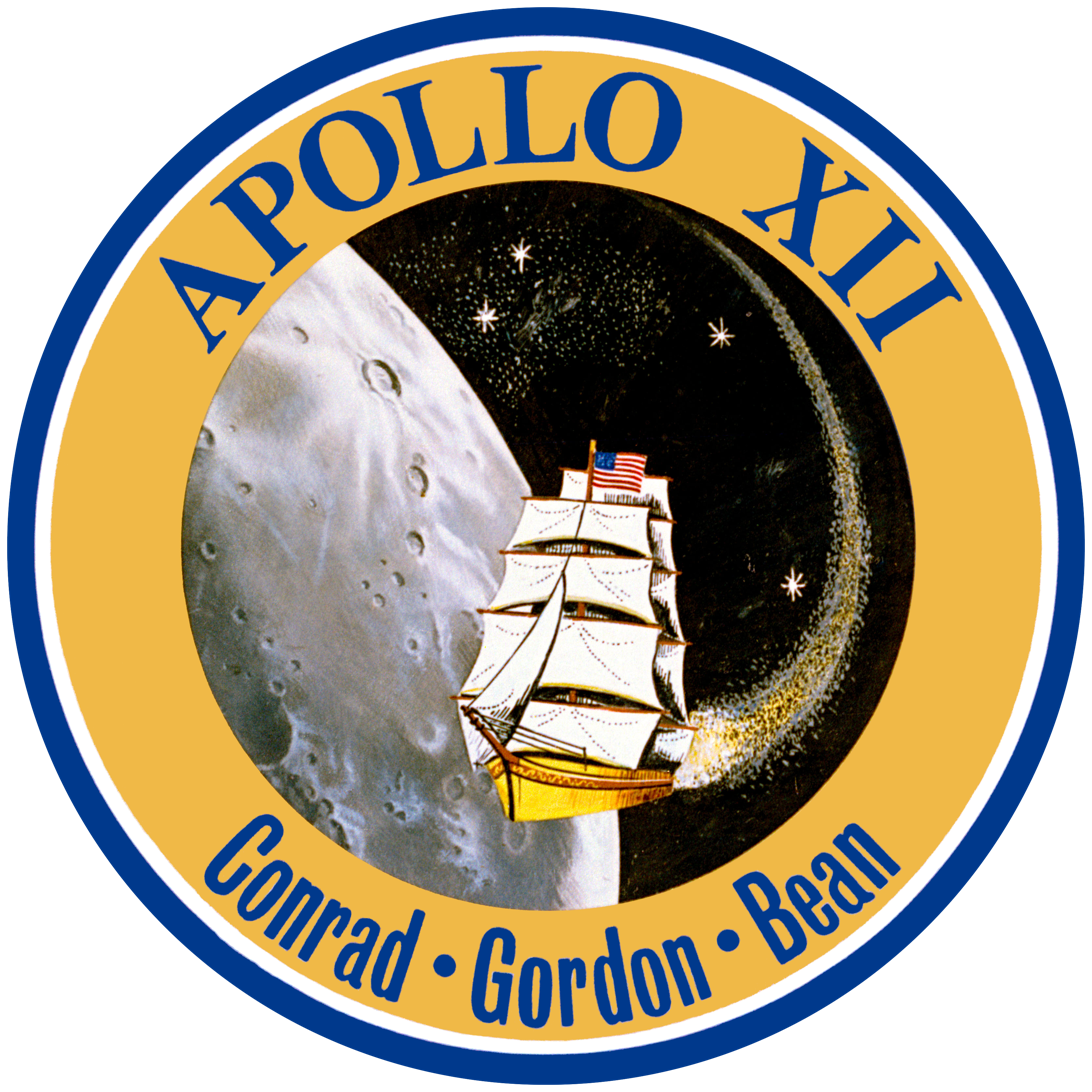

The Apollo 12 mission patch shows the crew's naval background; all three astronauts at the time of the mission were U.S. Navy commanders. It features a clipper ship arriving at the Moon, representing the CM Yankee Clipper. The ship trails fire, and flies the flag of the United States. The mission name APOLLO XII and the crew names are on a wide gold border, with a small blue trim. Blue and gold are traditional U.S. Navy colors. The patch has four stars on it – one each for the three astronauts who flew the mission and one for Clifton Williams, the original LMP on Conrad's crew who was killed in 1967 and would have flown the mission. The star was placed there at the suggestion of his replacement, Bean.

The insignia was designed by the crew with the aid of several employees of NASA contractors. The Apollo 12 landing area on the Moon is within the portion of the lunar surface shown on the insignia, based on a photograph of a globe of the Moon, taken by engineers. The clipper ship was based on photographs of such a ship obtained by Bean.

== Aftermath and spacecraft location ==
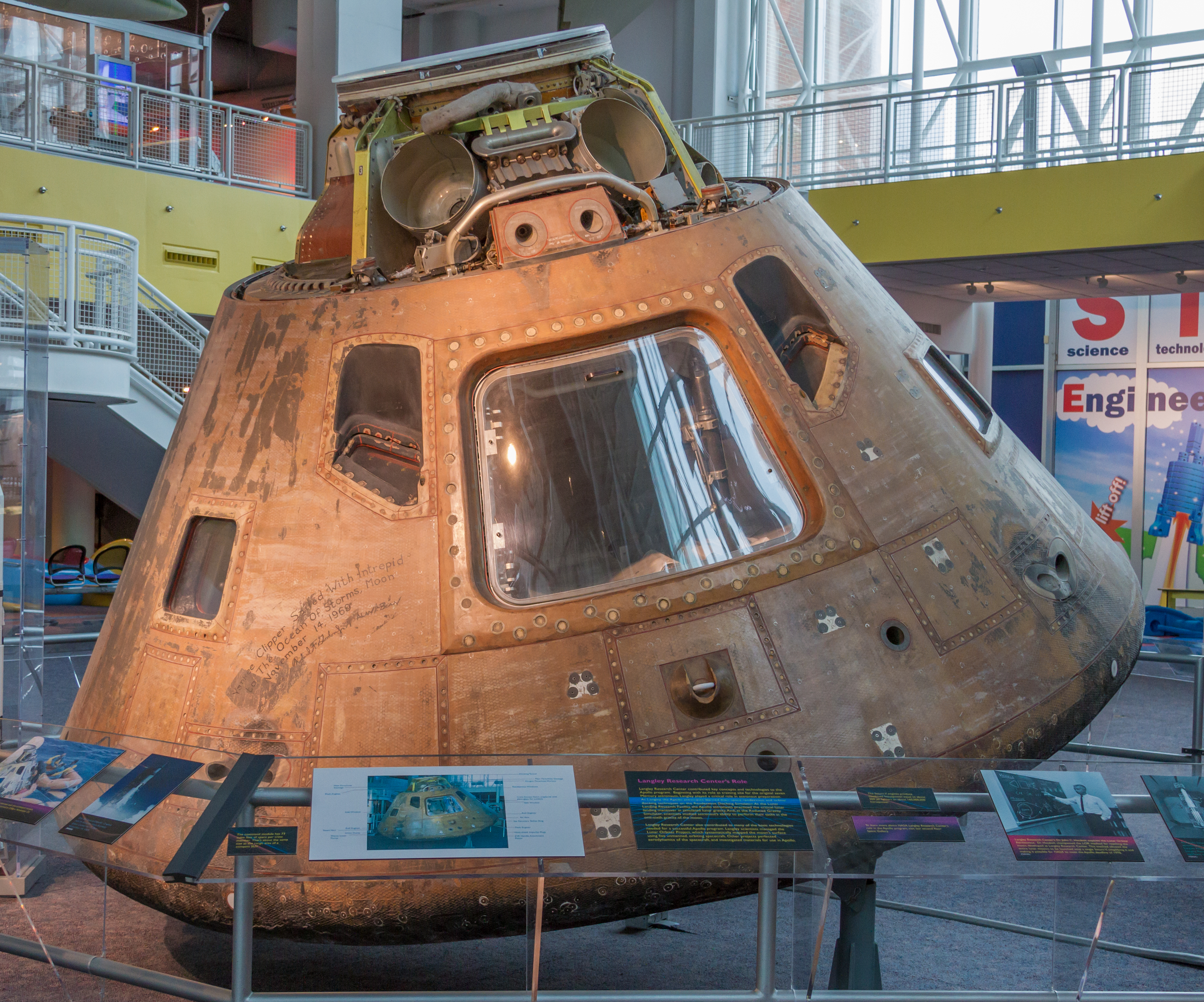
Apollo 12 CM Yankee Clipper on display at the Virginia Air and Space Center in Hampton, Virginia

After the mission, Conrad urged his crewmates to join him in the Skylab program, seeing in it the best chance of flying in space again. Bean did so—Conrad commanded Skylab 2, the first crewed mission to the space station, while Bean commanded Skylab 3. Gordon, though, still hoped to walk on the Moon and remained with the Apollo program, serving as backup commander of Apollo 15. He was the likely commander of Apollo 18, but that mission was canceled and he did not fly in space again.

The Apollo 12 command module Yankee Clipper, was displayed at the Paris Air Show and was then placed at NASA's Langley Research Center in Hampton, Virginia; ownership was transferred to the Smithsonian in July 1971. It is on display at the Virginia Air and Space Center in Hampton.

Mission Control had remotely fired the service module's thrusters after jettison, hoping to have it skip off the atmosphere and enter a high-apogee orbit, but the lack of tracking data confirming this caused it to conclude it most likely burned up in the atmosphere at the time of CM re-entry. The S-IVB is in a solar orbit that is sometimes affected by the Earth.

The ascent stage of LM Intrepid impacted the Moon November 20, 1969, at 22:17:17.7 UT (5:17 pm EST) 3.94°S 21.20°W. In 2009, the Lunar Reconnaissance Orbiter (LRO) photographed the Apollo 12 landing site, where the descent stage, ALSEP, Surveyor 3 spacecraft, and astronaut footpaths remain. In 2011, the LRO returned to the landing site at a lower altitude to take higher resolution photographs.

== See also ==
- List of artificial objects on the Moon
- List of missions to the Moon
- List of spacewalks and moonwalks 1965–1999
