= Ammonius (crater) =

Crater on the Moon

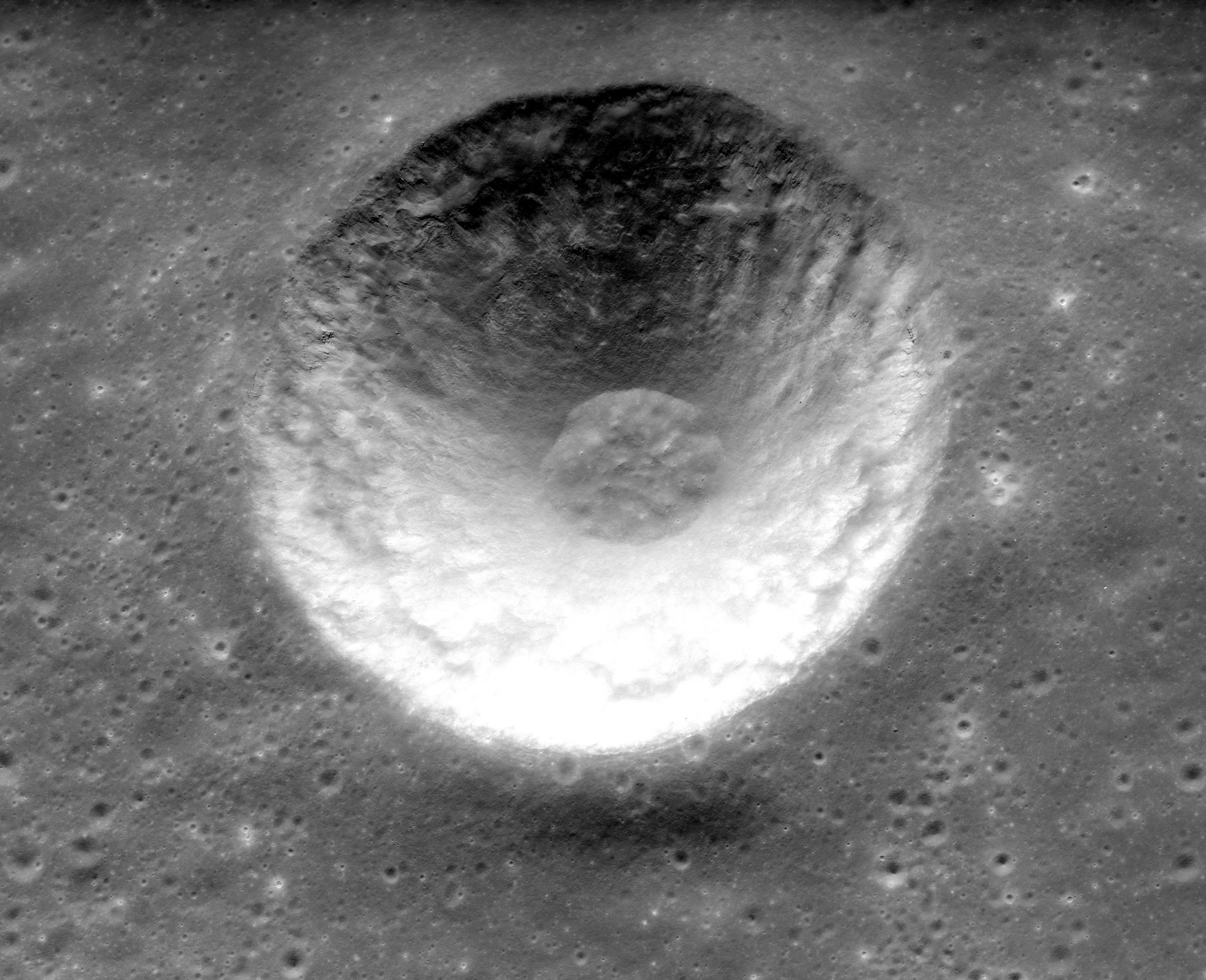
- Slightly oblique view from Apollo 16, facing east
- Coordinates: 8.5°S 0.8°W
- Diameter: 8.55 km (5.31 mi)
- Depth: 1.54 km (0.96 mi)
- Colongitude: 1° at sunrise
- Eponym: Ammonius Hermiae

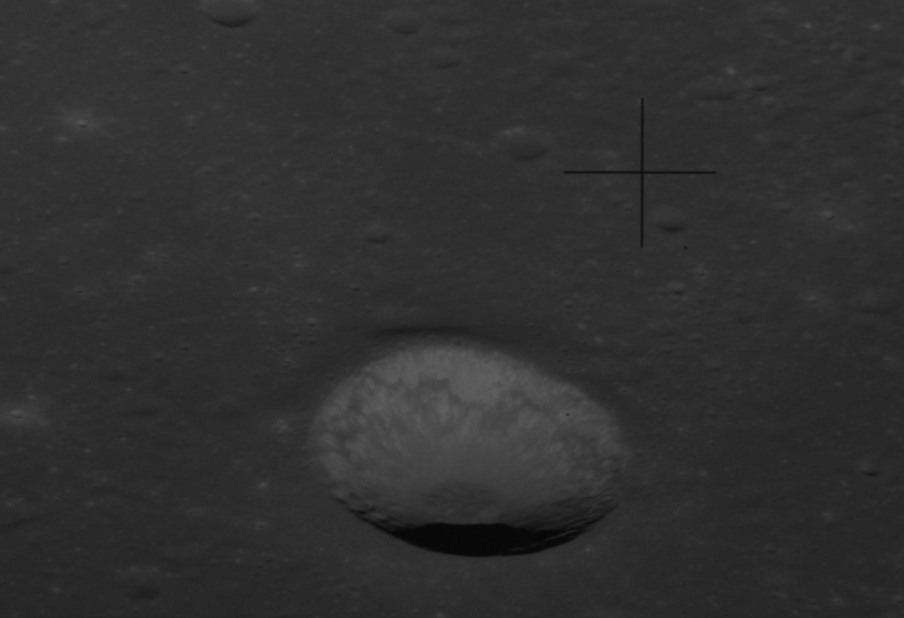
Oblique view from Apollo 14, facing west

Ammonius is a bowl-shaped lunar impact crater with a slightly raised rim. It is located on the floor of the walled plain named Ptolemaeus, about 30 kilometers northeast of the crater midpoint.

Just to the north on the lava-flooded floor of Ptolemaeus is a relatively prominent "ghost" crater: the discernible buried rim of a pre-existing crater. The diameter of this ghost crater is nearly double that of Ammonius, and is currently identified as Ptolemaeus B.

The crater is named after Greek philosopher Ammonius Hermiae (c. A.D. 517–526). In the past this crater was identified as Ptolemaeus A, before being named by the IAU in 1976.
