= Bowen-Apollo =

Lunar impact crater

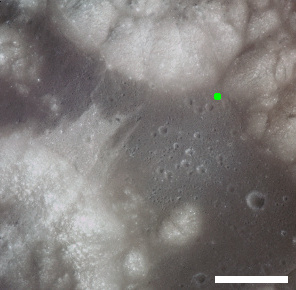
- Location of Bowen-Apollo crater in Taurus-Littrow Valley. South Massif is at lower left, North Massif is at top center, and Sculptured Hills are at upper right. Scale bar is 5 km
- Coordinates: 20.27°N 30.87°E
- Diameter: 300 m
- Eponym: Astronaut-named feature

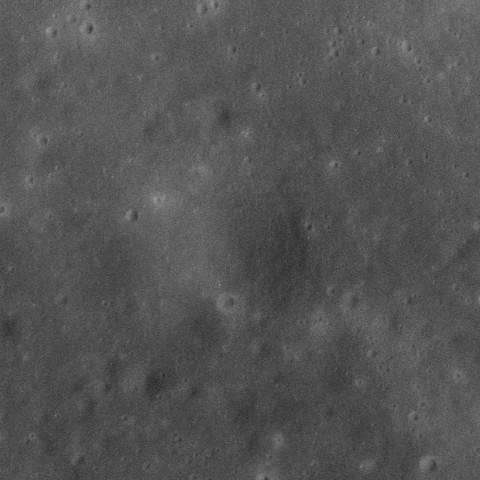
Apollo 17 panoramic camera image from low lunar orbit

Bowen-Apollo is a feature on Earth's Moon, a crater in Taurus-Littrow valley, located at the foot of the Sculptured Hills. Astronauts Eugene Cernan and Harrison Schmitt landed to the southwest of it in 1972, on the Apollo 17 mission. They referred to it as SWP crater during the mission, and a more subdued crater to the southeast of SWP was called Bowen. The IAU formally renamed SWP as Bowen-Apollo. It is located just east of Geology Station 8.

The two astronauts drove around the south rim of Bowen-Apollo. Bowen-Apollo is called SWP crater in the Apollo 17 Preliminary Science Report, and in some later publications. Soil sample 78120 was collected there, at the geology station designated LRV 11. Sample 78120 is a regolith breccia.

To the southwest of Bowen-Apollo are Cochise, Van Serg, and Shakespeare. To the west is Henry.

The crater was named by the astronauts after geologist Norman L. Bowen, originator of Bowen's reaction series.
