= Henry (Apollo lunar crater) =

Lunar crater in Taurus-Littrow valley

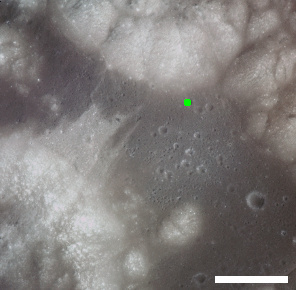
- Location of Henry crater in Taurus–Littrow valley. South Massif is at lower left, North Massif is at top center, and Sculptured Hills are at upper right. Scale bar is 5km
- Coordinates: 20.27°N 30.79°E
- Diameter: 300m
- Eponym: Astronaut-named feature

Henry is a feature on Earth's Moon, a crater in Taurus–Littrow valley, located at the foot of the Sculptured Hills. Astronauts Eugene Cernan and Harrison Schmitt landed to the southwest of it in 1972, on the Apollo 17 mission.

Henry is northwest of Shakespeare and Van Serg, and west of Cochise. It is south of Geology Station 6 of the Apollo 17 mission.

The crater's name is currently informal and not recognized by the International Astronomical Union (IAU), although nearly all the other features within the Taurus–Littrow valley that were named by the astronauts are. Possibly part of the reason is that the IAU recognizes the larger lunar crater Henry. The crater was named by the astronauts after the Portuguese Prince Henry the Navigator.

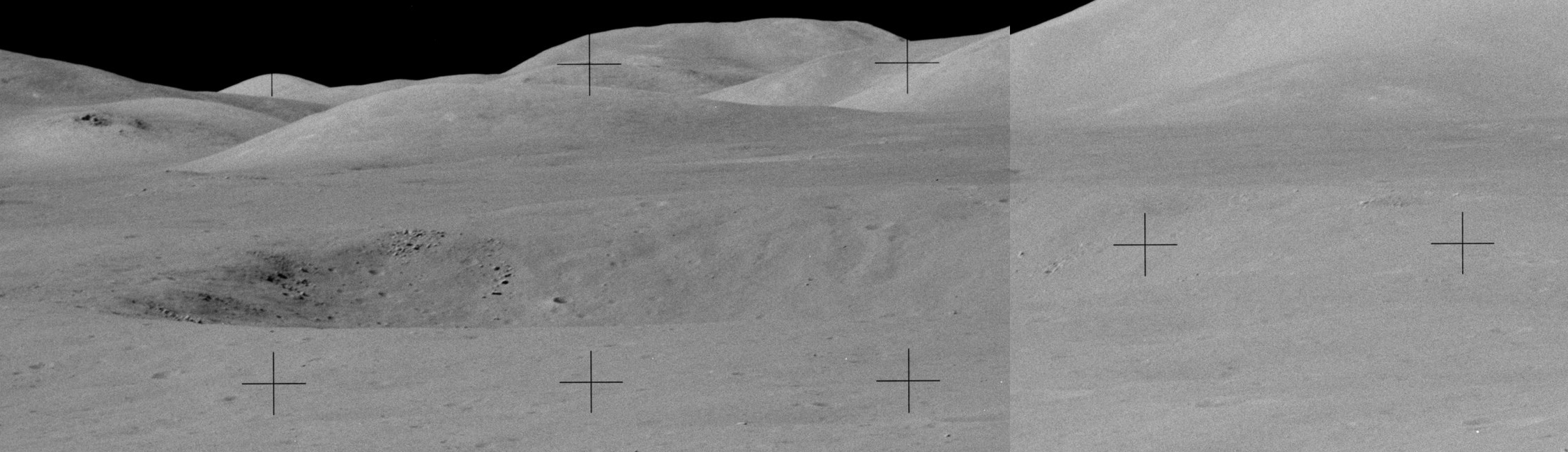
Mosaic showing Henry crater as viewed from Geology Station 6, some distance up the slope of the North Massif

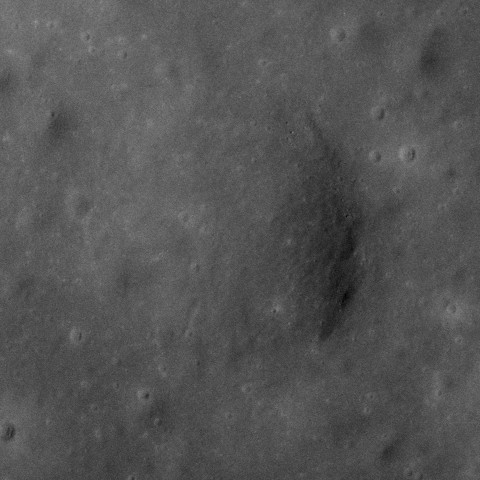
Apollo 17 panoramic camera image
