= Reginald Aldworth Daly =

Canadian geologist

- Born: May 19, 1871; Napanee, Ontario
- Died: September 19, 1957 (aged 86); Cambridge, Massachusetts
- Education: Victoria University, Toronto (B.A., 1891; S.B., 1892); Harvard University (Ph.D., 1896)
- Awards: Hayden Memorial Geological Award (1932); Penrose Medal (1935); Wollaston Medal (1942); William Bowie Medal (1946)
- Scientific career
- Fields: Geology
- Workplaces: Harvard University; Massachusetts Institute of Technology
- Doctoral advisor: John E. Wolff
- Doctoral students: Norman L. Bowen

Reginald Aldworth Daly (May 19, 1871 – September 19, 1957) was a Canadian geologist. He is best known for being one of the first proponents of the giant-impact hypothesis of the formation of the Moon.

== Biography ==
Reginald Daly was educated at the University of Toronto, where geologist A.P. Coleman persuaded him away from teaching mathematics and into Earth Sciences. He obtained his PhD at Harvard, and did postgraduate work in Germany and France. After working as a field geologist for the International Boundary Commission, he was a professor, and headed the Department of Geology at Harvard University from 1912 until 1942. Daly was president of The Geological Society of America in 1932.

For the Boundary Commission, working in six field seasons, Daly mapped the border from the Pacific Ocean to the Great Plains, a rugged swath 400 miles (640 km) long and 5 to 10 miles (8.0 to 16.1 km) wide – an area of about 2,500 square miles (6,500 km^{2}). He documented the geology alone, but had the help of one field assistant and numerous wranglers and porters. He collected 1,500 rock specimens and made 960 thin sections, using a German polishing technique he learnt as a student. The project also included 1,300 photographs, dozens of lake soundings, stratigraphic and structural mapping, petrology, and morphology. In 1912, he filed his final report with the Geological Survey of Canada, a massive 3-volume tome he called North America Cordillera: Forty-Ninth Parallel. This work along the 49th parallel led him to formulate a theory of the origins of igneous rocks, and later publish his seminal work Igneous Rocks and Their Origin in 1914.

According to Daly's biographer, James Natland, Daly was an early proponent of Arthur Holmes and Alfred Wegener's continental drift theory. Daly summarized his ideas in his 1926 book, Our Mobile Earth, which included on the title page small print adopted from Galileo: E pur si muove. Daly's theory on continental displacement was based partly on the idea that after the Moon was ejected from the Earth, continental movement was an inevitable part of rebalancing the planet; he also suggested that continental material accruing near oceans eventually slips, and forces continents to creep along. He expanded this notion in Strength and Structure of the Earth, in 1940, where Daly anticipated aspects of plate tectonics, including introduction of a "mesospheric shell" and a slippery vitreous basaltic substratum.

Daly also proposed the impact theory of lunar creation in 1946, which countered two prevailing notions: George Darwin's hypothesis that the Moon spun out of the primordial Earth due to centrifugal force; and, another fashionable theory that the Moon was a captured wayward asteroid. Daly applied Newtonian physics to make his point, which was later validated.

His doctoral students included the Canadian geologist Norman L. Bowen, who, based on experiments and observations of natural rocks, summarized the order of crystallization of common silicate minerals from typical basaltic magma undergoing fractional crystallization, now known as Bowen's reaction series.

== Family ==
In 1903, Daly married Louise Porter Haskell, daughter of Alexander Cheves Haskell and Alice Van Yeveren, and elder sister of Mary Elizabeth Haskell. After their marriage, Louise accompanied Daly on his travels, and in the field, as an assistant. She did much of the work in preparing and editing his manuscripts and books, and Daly's 1914 book on 'Igneous Rocks and their Origin' is dedicated to her; his "inspiring fellow worker".

== Awards ==
In 1909, Daly was elected a member of the American Academy of Arts and Sciences. He was elected to the American Philosophical Society in 1913 and the United States National Academy of Sciences in 1925. Daly was awarded the Penrose Medal in 1935, the Wollaston Medal in 1942 and the William Bowie Medal in 1946. In 1950 he became foreign member of the Royal Netherlands Academy of Arts and Sciences. The potassium zirconium silicate mineral dalyite and craters on Mars and the Moon are named in his honor. His Cambridge, Massachusetts, house (the Reginald A. Daly House) is now a National Historic Landmark.

== Bibliography ==
- Daly, R A (1940), "Strength and Structure of the Earth", Prentice-Hall, New York, p. 434, hdl:2027/mdp.39015005801728, ISBN 978-0028435206
- Daly, RA (1933), "The Depths of the Earth", Science, 77 (1987) (published Jan 27, 1933): 95–102, Bibcode:1933Sci....77...95D, doi:10.1126/science.77.1987.95, PMID 17797838
- Daly, RA (1931), "Gardiner on Coral Reefs", Science, 74 (1927) (published Dec 4, 1931): 566–567, Bibcode:1931Sci....74..566D, doi:10.1126/science.74.1927.566, PMID 17807633
- Daly, R A (1920), "A General Sinking of Sea-Level in Recent Time", Proc. Natl. Acad. Sci. U.S.A., vol. 6, no. 5 (published May 1920), pp. 246–50, Bibcode:1920PNAS....6..246D, doi:10.1073/pnas.6.5.246, PMC 1084496, PMID 16586806
- Daly, R A (1917), "Low-Temperature Formation of Alkaline Feldspars in Limestones", Proc. Natl. Acad. Sci. U.S.A., vol. 3, no. 11 (published Nov 1917), pp. 659–65, Bibcode:1917PNAS....3..659D, doi:10.1073/pnas.3.11.659, PMC 1091350, PMID 16576265
- Daly, R A (1916), "A New Test of the Subsidence Theory of Coral Reefs", Proc. Natl. Acad. Sci. U.S.A., vol. 2, no. 12 (published Dec 1916), pp. 664–70, Bibcode:1916PNAS....2..664D, doi:10.1073/pnas.2.12.664, PMC 1091132, PMID 16586654
- Daly, RA (1901), "Notes on Oceanography", Science, vol. 13, no. 337 (published Jun 14, 1901), pp. 951–954, Bibcode:1901Sci....13..951D, doi:10.1126/science.13.337.951, PMID 17733661
- Daly, RA (1901), "Scientific Expedition to Iceland, Greenland and Labrador", Science, 13 (318) (published Feb 1, 1901): 192, Bibcode:1901Sci....13R.192D, doi:10.1126/science.13.318.192, PMID 17816318
