= Steven L. Goldstein =

American geochemist

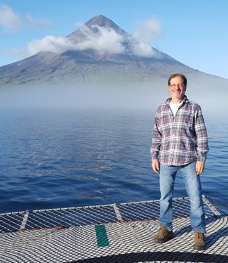
- Goldstein during field work in the Aleutian Islands, AK
- Born: East New York (Brooklyn), NY
- Education: Columbia University; Harvard University
- Known for: Geochemistry
- Scientific career
- Fields: Earth science
- Workplaces: Max Planck Institute for Chemistry; Columbia University

Steven L. Goldstein is an American geochemist. He is the Higgins Professor of Earth and Environmental Sciences at Columbia University and interim director of the Lamont–Doherty Earth Observatory.

== Education ==
Goldstein received his B.A. from Columbia College in Chemistry with a minor in philosophy. He earned his M.A. from Harvard University in the Department of Earth and Planetary Sciences.

Goldstein earned his PhD from Columbia University.

== Awards and honors ==
Goldstein was inducted as a fellow of the American Geophysical Union in 2009 and as a fellow of the Geochemical Society and European Association of Geochemistry in 2018.

In 2018, he was honored with the Norman L. Bowen Award and Lectureship by the American Geophysical Union for his contributions to volcanology, geochemistry, or petrology.

From 2005 to 2022, Goldstein earned three teaching awards from Columbia University, most recently the Great Teacher award in 2022.

== Personal life ==
Goldstein is married to Kerstin Lehnert, a research scientist at the Lamont-Doherty Earth Observatory.
