= Cochise (crater) =

Lunar impact crater in the Taurus–Littrow valley

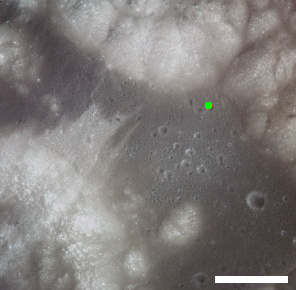
- Location of Cochise crater in Taurus-Littrow Valley. South Massif is at lower left, North Massif is at top center, and Sculptured Hills are at upper right. Scale bar is 5 km
- Coordinates: 20.25°N 30.84°E
- Diameter: 560 m
- Eponym: Astronaut-named feature

Cochise is a feature on Earth's Moon, a crater in Taurus-Littrow valley. Astronauts Eugene Cernan and Harrison Schmitt landed southwest of it in 1972, on the Apollo 17 mission. They drove along its rim in the rover during EVA 3, but did not stop.

To the southwest are Shakespeare and Van Serg, and to the northeast is Bowen and Geology Station 8 at the base of the Sculptured Hills.

The crater was named by the astronauts after Cochise, Chief of the Chiricahua Apache.

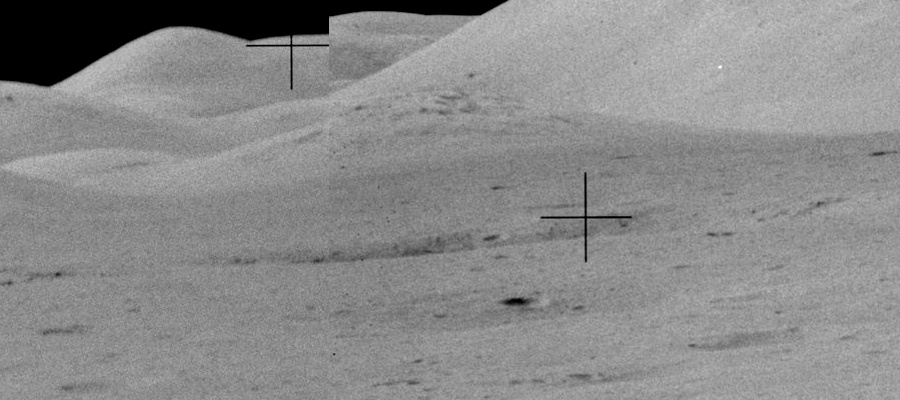
Cochise in foreground as viewed from Geology Station 6, some distance up the North Massif

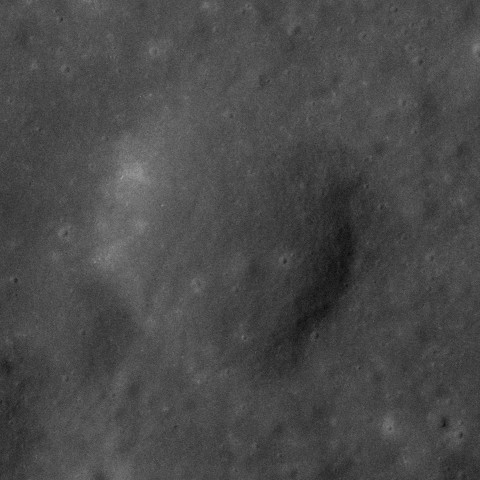
Apollo 17 panoramic camera image from low lunar orbit
