= Shakespeare (lunar crater) =

Crater on the Moon

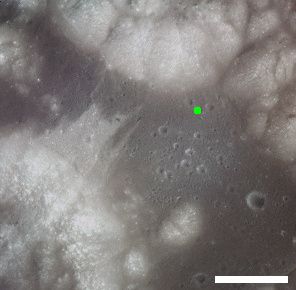
- Location of Shakespeare crater in Taurus–Littrow valley. South Massif is at lower left, North Massif is at top center, and Sculptured Hills are at upper right. Scale bar is 5 km
- Coordinates: 20.24°N 30.82°E
- Diameter: 540 m
- Eponym: Astronaut-named feature

Shakespeare is a feature on Earth's Moon, a crater in Taurus–Littrow valley. Astronauts Eugene Cernan and Harrison Schmitt landed southwest of it in 1972, on the Apollo 17 mission. They did not visit it, but in fact drove around it during EVA 3.

To the south is Van Serg, to the northeast is Cochise, and to the northwest is a crater unofficially called Henry on some maps.

The crater was named by the astronauts after English playwright William Shakespeare.

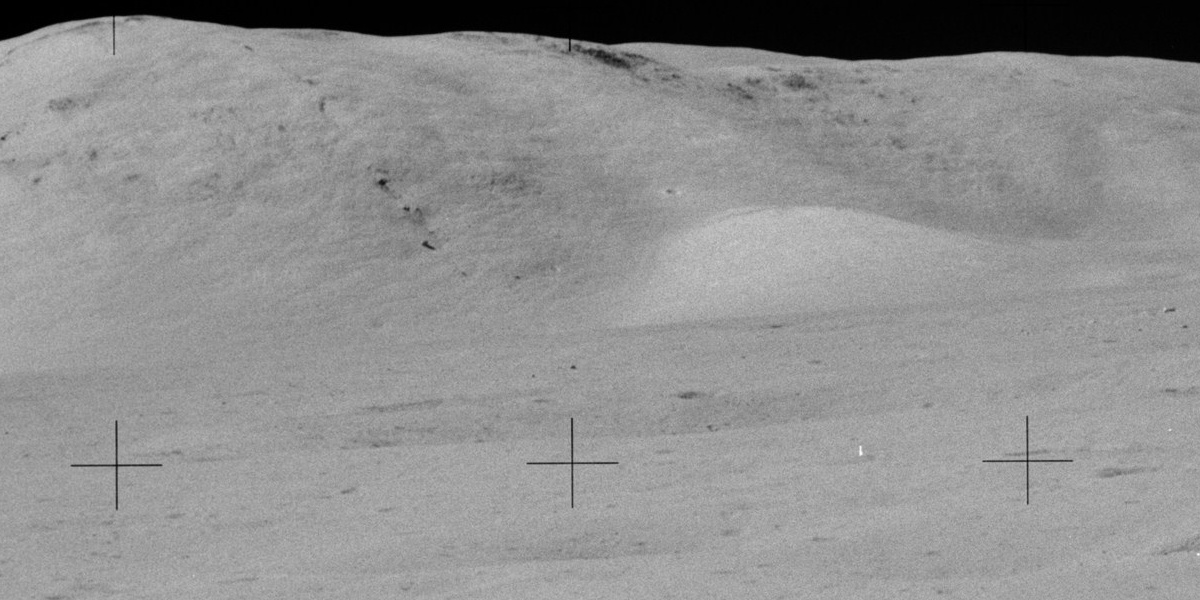
Shakespeare in foreground as viewed from Geology Station 6, some distance up the North Massif

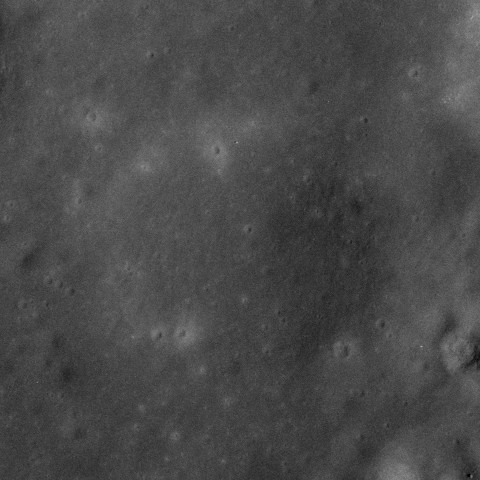
Apollo 17 panoramic camera image
