= Norman L. Bowen =

Canadian geologist

Norman Levi Bowen
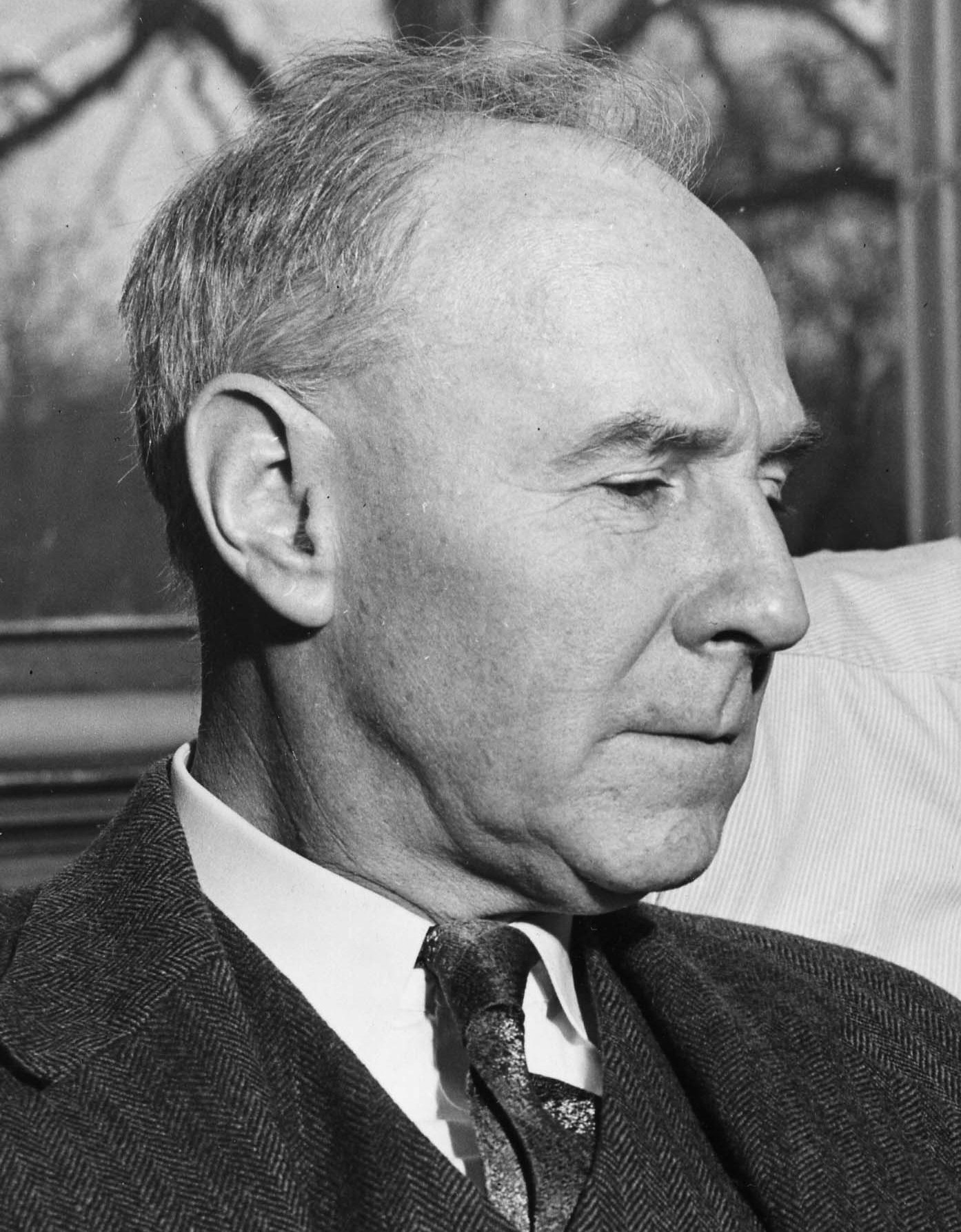
- Norman Levi Bowen
- Born: Norman Levi Bowen; June 21, 1887; Kingston, Ontario, Canada
- Died: September 11, 1956 (aged 69)
- Education: BSc, Queen's University School of Mining, Kingston, Ontario; PhD, Massachusetts Institute of Technology, 1912
- Known for: Bowen's reaction series
- Awards: Bigsby Medal (1931); Penrose Medal (1941); Member of NAS; ForMemRS (1949); Roebling Medal (1950); Wollaston Medal (1950)
- Scientific career
- Fields: Petrology
- Workplaces: Carnegie Institution for Science
- Doctoral advisor: Reginald A. Daly

Norman Levi Bowen FRS (June 21, 1887 – September 11, 1956) was a Canadian geologist. Bowen "revolutionized experimental petrology and our understanding of mineral crystallization". Beginning geology students are familiar with Bowen's reaction series depicting how different minerals crystallize under varying pressures and temperatures."

== Career ==
Bowen conducted experimental research at the Geophysical Laboratory, Carnegie Institution for Science of Washington from 1912 to 1937. He published The Evolution of the Igneous Rocks in 1928. This book set the stage for a geochemical and geophysical foundation for the study of rocks and minerals.

== Personal life ==
Born in Kingston, Ontario, Canada, Bowen married Mary Lamont in 1911, and they had a daughter, Catherine.

== Awards and honours ==
Bowen was elected to the American Academy of Arts and Sciences in 1921, the American Philosophical Society in 1930, and the United States National Academy of Sciences in 1935. He was awarded the Penrose Medal of the Geological Society of America in 1941 and served as their president in 1945. He was elected a Foreign Member of the Royal Society (ForMemRS) in 1949.

The Norman L. Bowen Award, awarded annually by the American Geophysical Union, is named in his honour.

The astronauts of Apollo 17 named a small lunar crater after him.
