= Van Serg =

Crater on the Moon

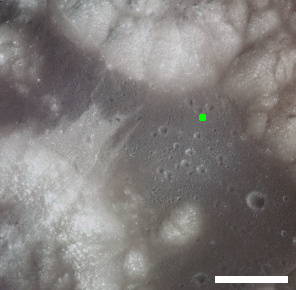
- Location of Van Serg crater in Taurus–Littrow valley. South Massif is at lower left, North Massif is at top center, and Sculptured Hills are at upper right. Scale bar is 5 km
- Coordinates: 20.23°N 30.83°E
- Diameter: 100 m
- Eponym: Nicholas Vanserg (pen name of Hugh McKinstry)

Van Serg is a feature on Earth's Moon, a crater in Taurus–Littrow valley. Astronauts Eugene Cernan and Harrison Schmitt visited it in 1972, on the Apollo 17 mission, during EVA 3. Van Serg was designated Geology Station 9.

To the northwest is Shakespeare and to the northeast are Cochise and Geology Station 8 at the base of the Sculptured Hills. To the south is Sherlock, and to the southwest are the Apollo 17 landing site and the large crater Camelot.

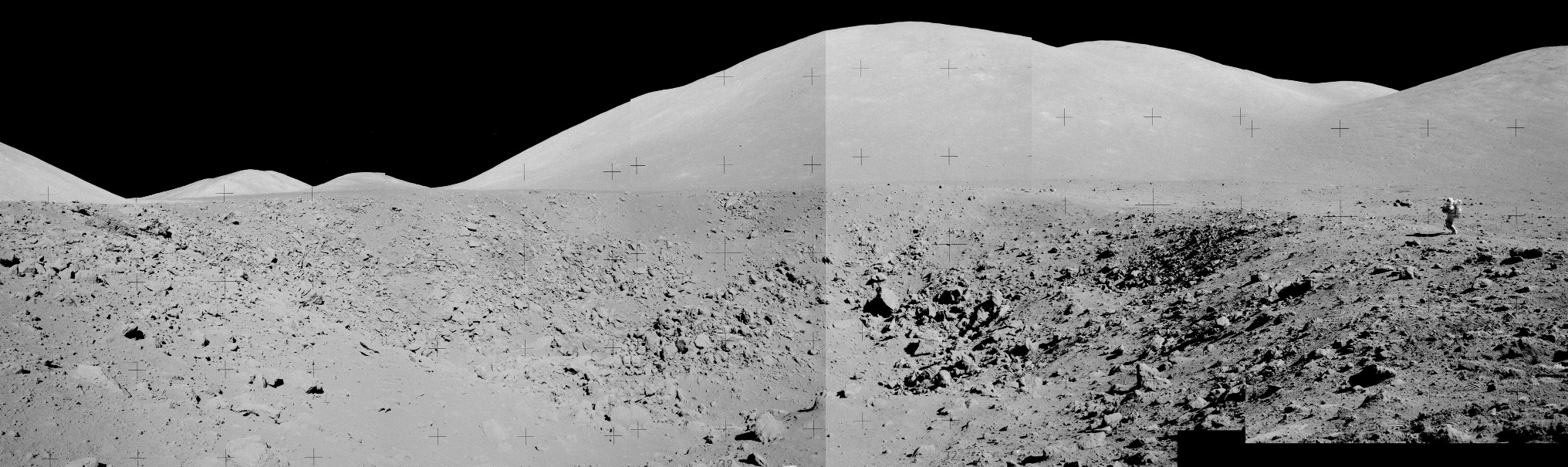
View of Van Serg with Eugene Cernan at right. North Massif is on the horizon.

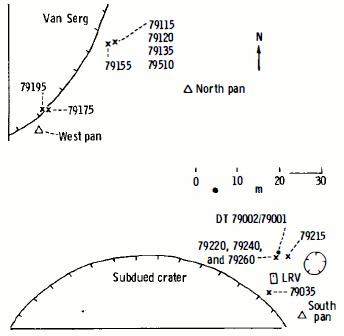
Planimetric map of Station 9 including the rim of Van Serg.

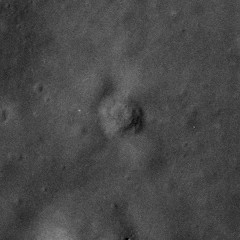
Apollo 17 panoramic camera image.

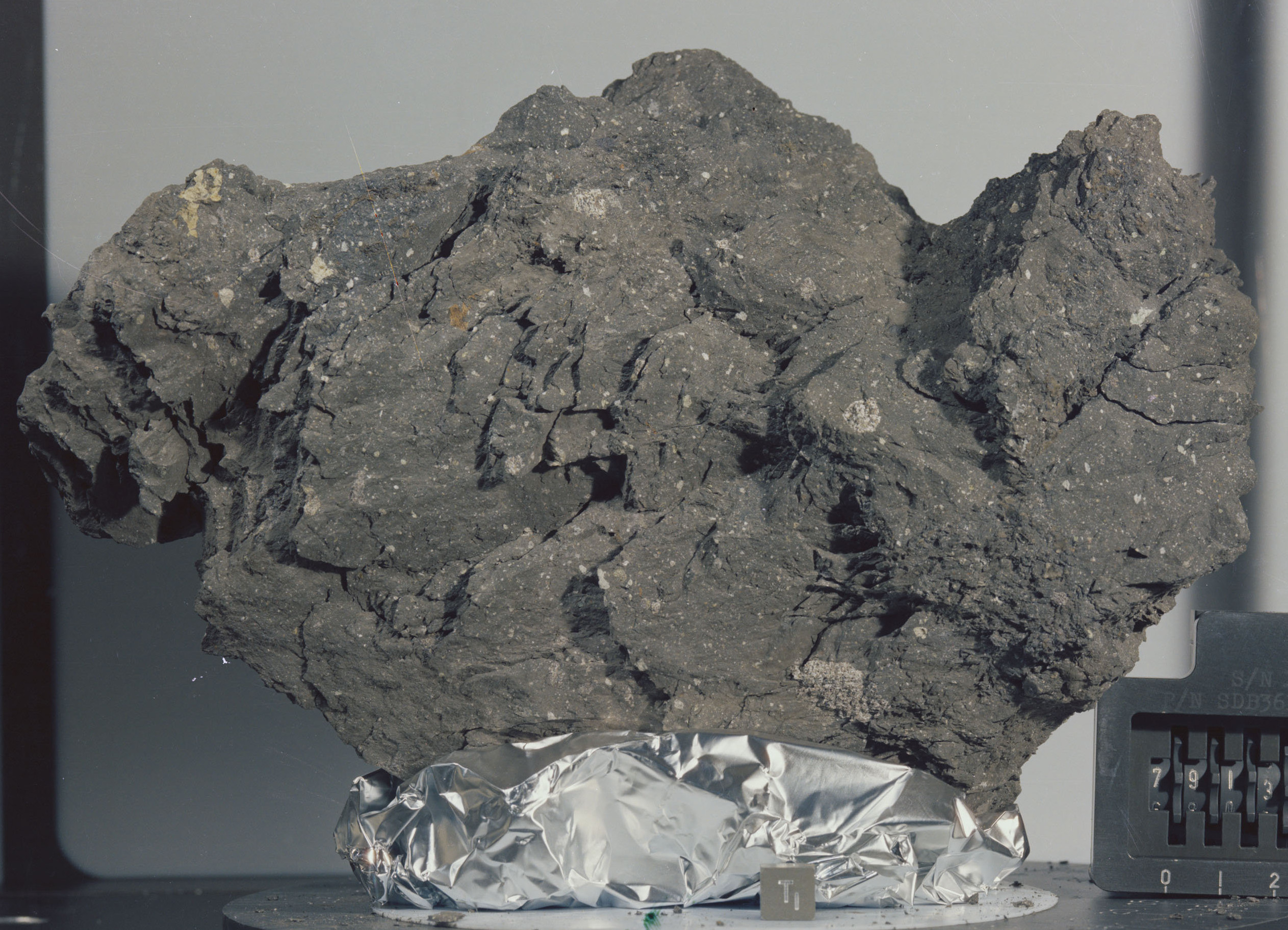
Dark matrix breccia from Van Serg cratering ejecta (sample 79135). Although this material is coherent enough to maintain fractures that produce small plates and wedges, the fragments are quite friable and break from the specimen during handling. Note the various light-gray clasts, some of which are feldspathic breccias. (NASA caption)

== Name ==
The crater was named by the astronauts after Harvard University geology professor Hugh McKinstry, who, according to their explanation, sometimes wrote satire under the pseudonym "Nicholas Van Serg". In fact, McKinstry's pseudonym was Nicholas Vanserg.

Songwriter, humorist and academic Tom Lehrer, who attended and taught at Harvard, suggested that McKinstry's pseudonym was inspired by the name of the Vanserg Building at Harvard, which is an acronym of its original tenants: Veterans Administration, Naval Science, Electronic Research, and Graduate dining hall. Since it was a temporary building, it never got a "real" name. (As of 2025, his wooden building still exists.) A slightly different list of tenants reported is "Veterans Administration, Naval Science, Electronic Research, and Graduate School".

== Samples ==
The following samples were collected from Van Serg crater (Station 9), as listed in Table 7-I of the Apollo 17 Preliminary Science Report. The "Rock Type" is from the table, and the "Lithology" is from the Lunar Sample Compendium of the Lunar and Planetary Institute or NASA's Lunar Sample Catalog.

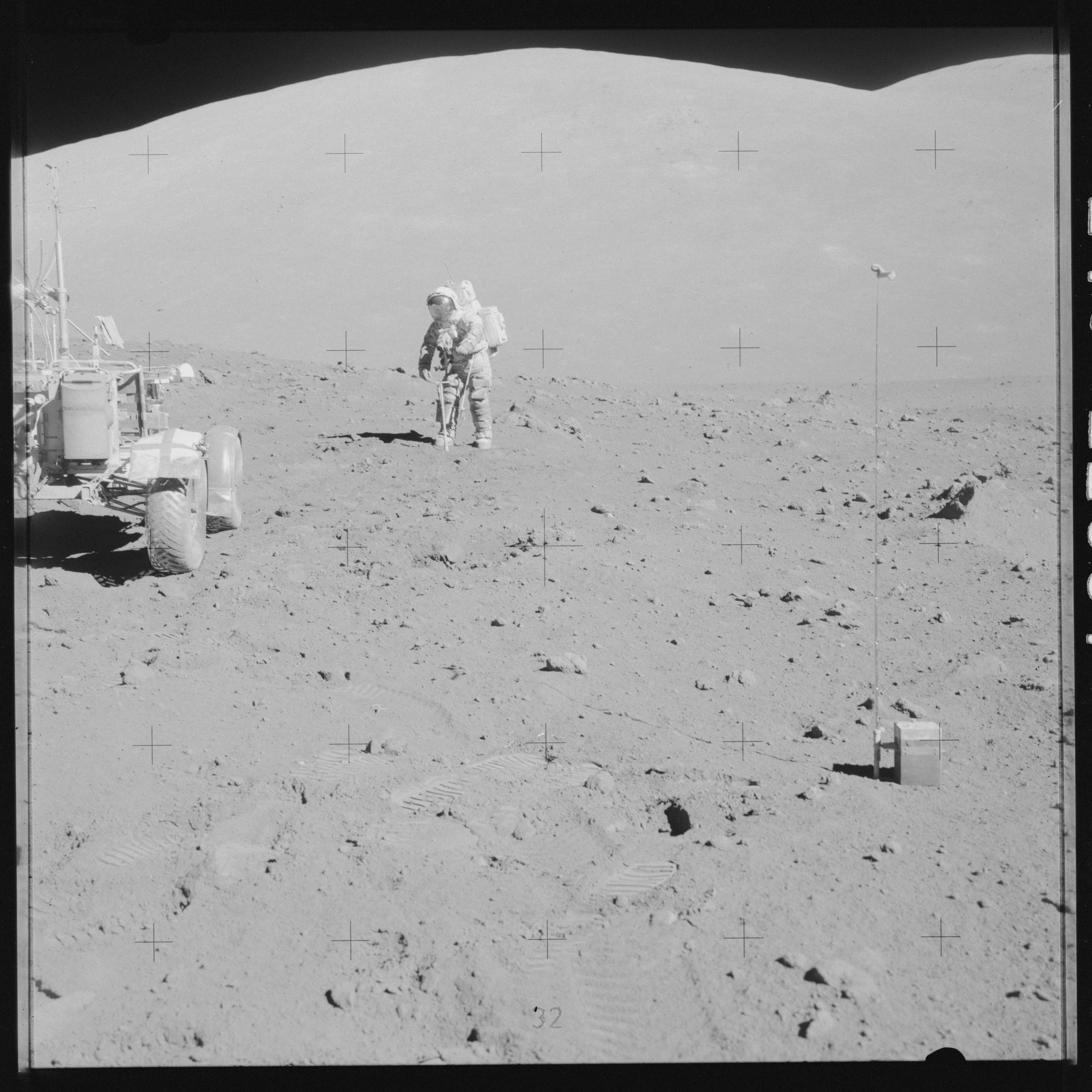
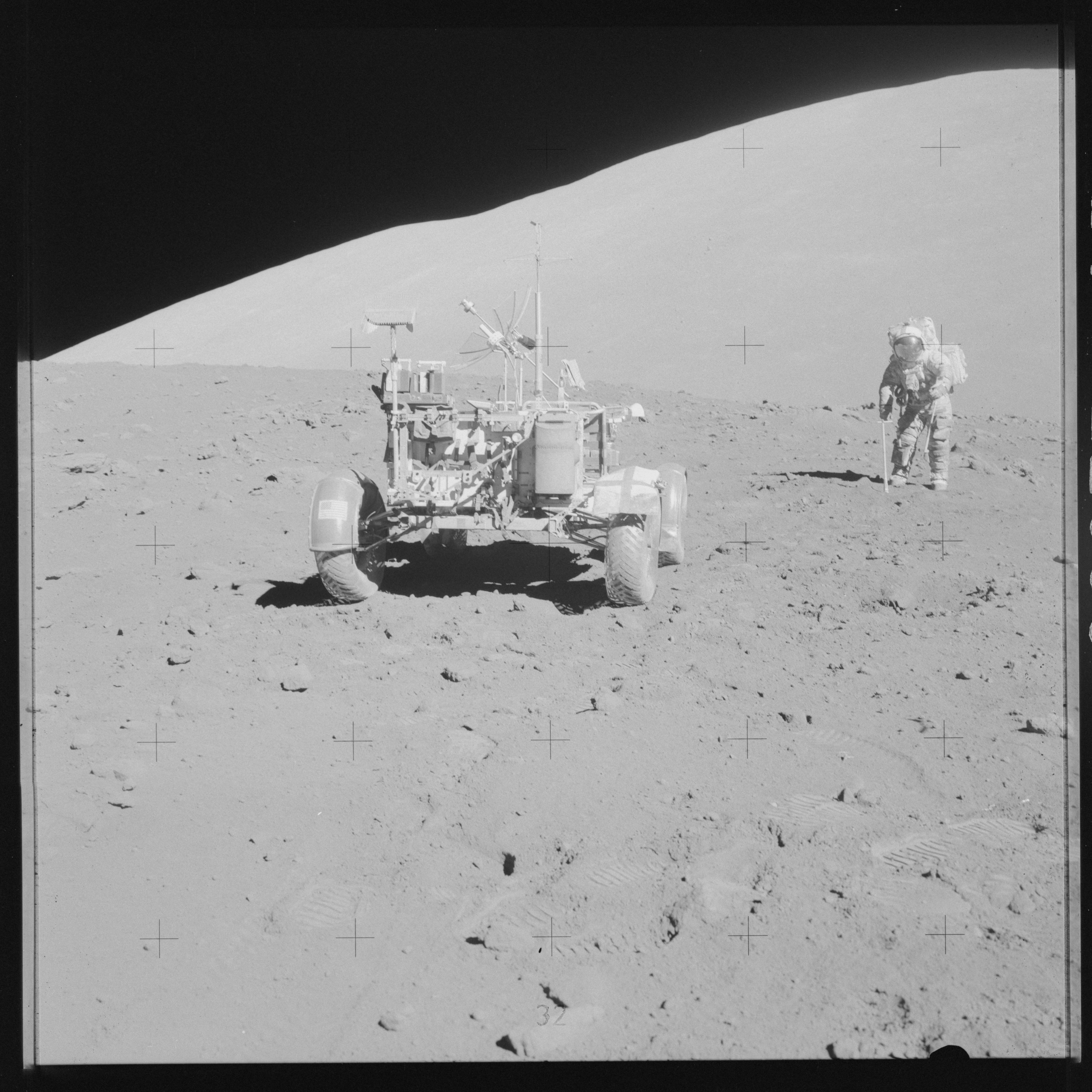
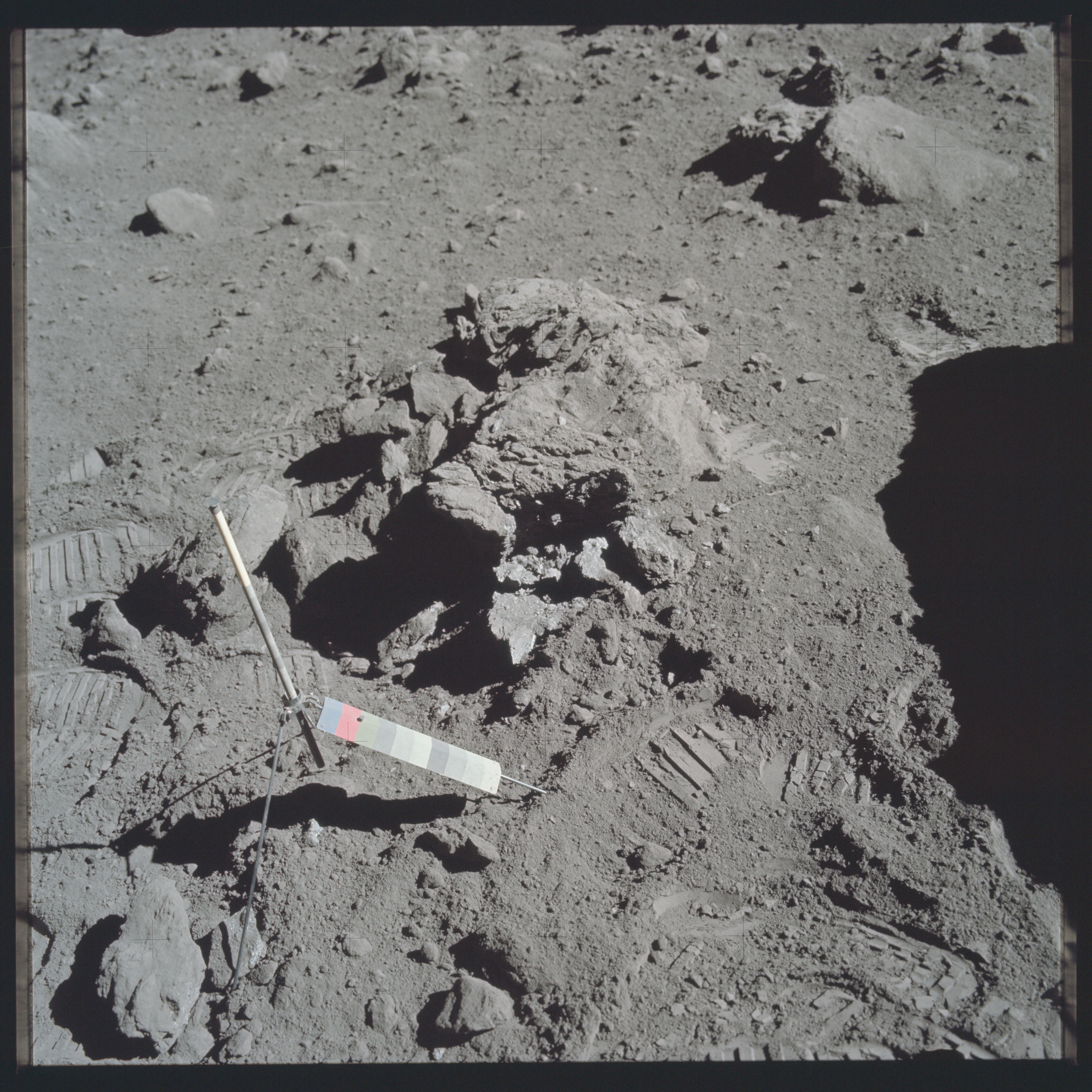
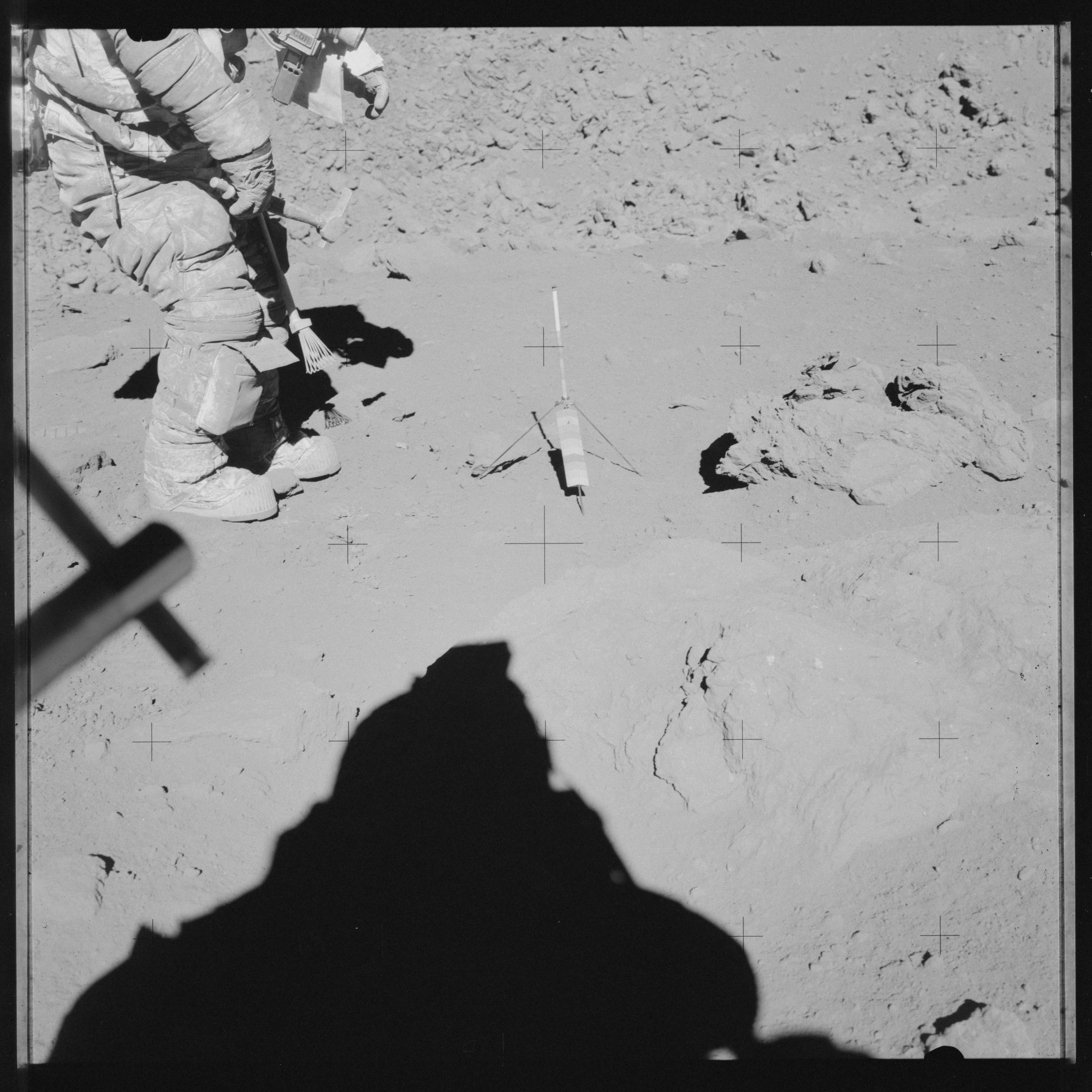
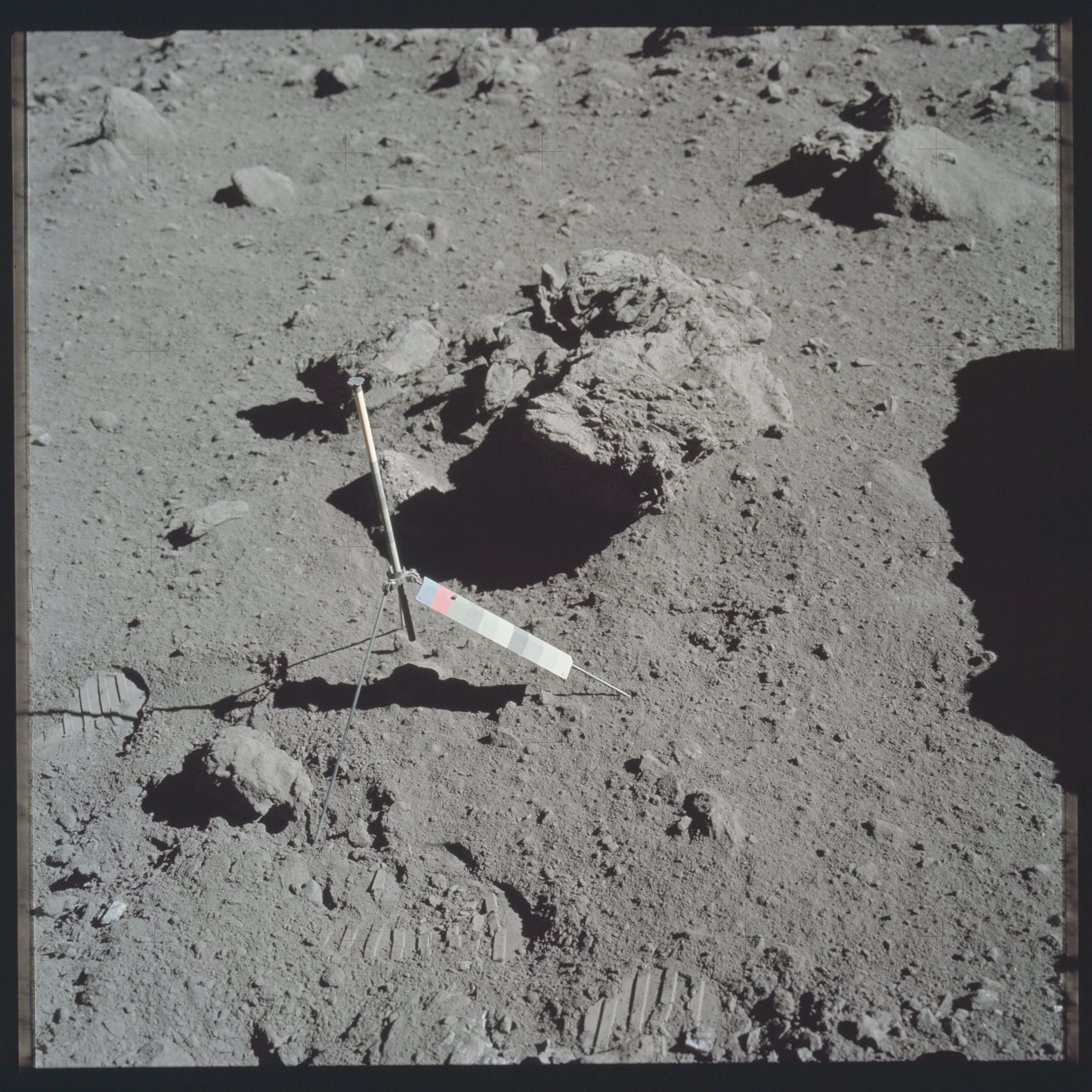
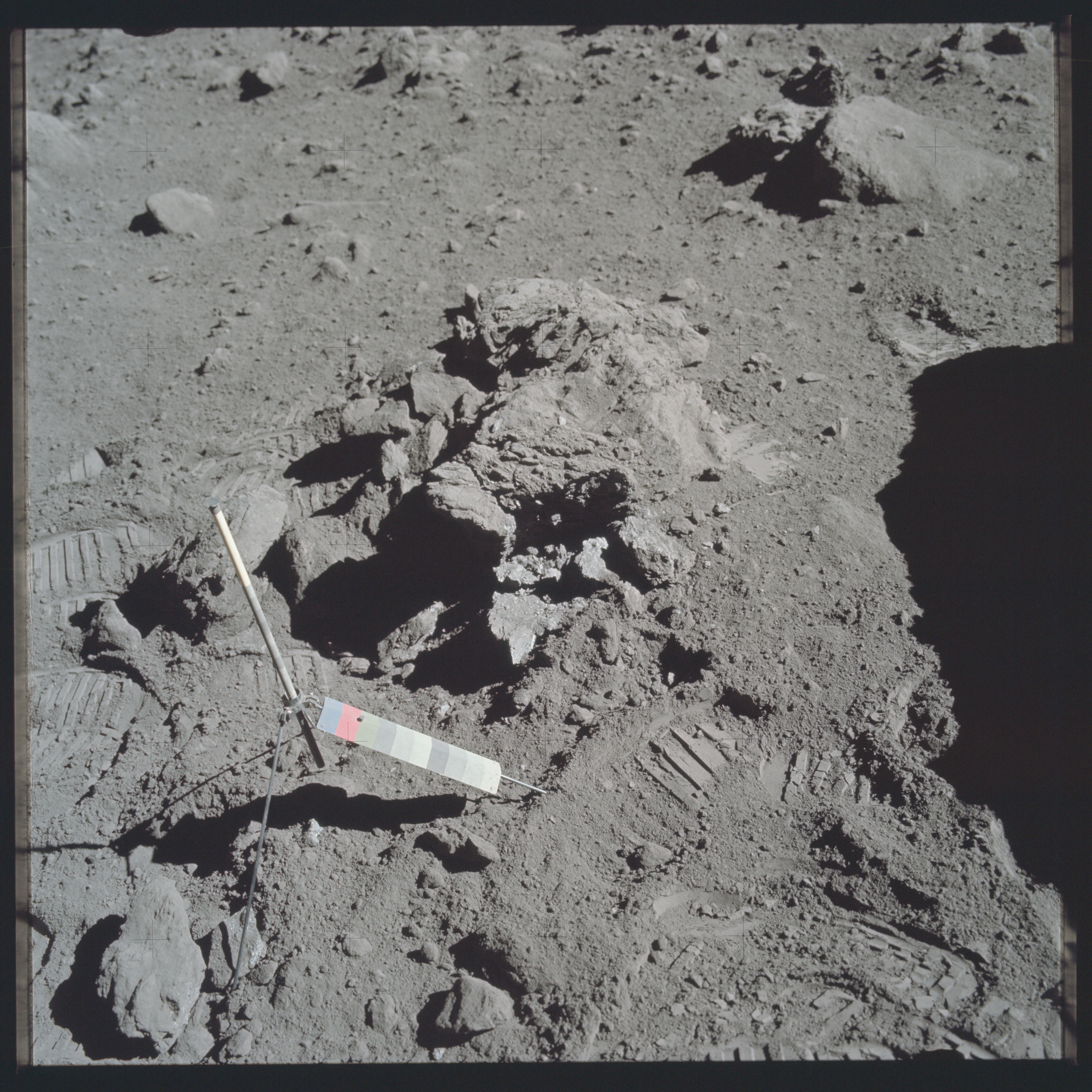
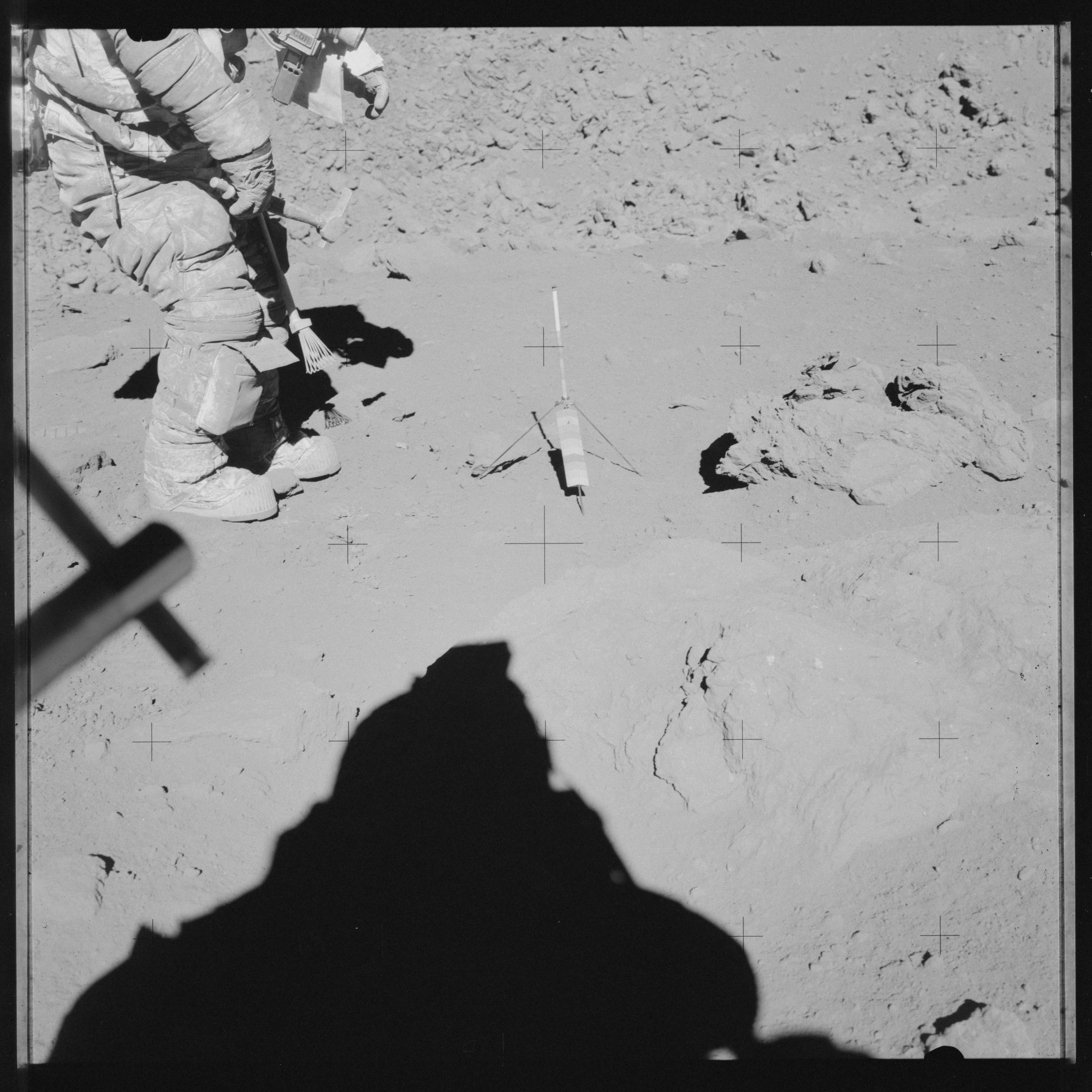
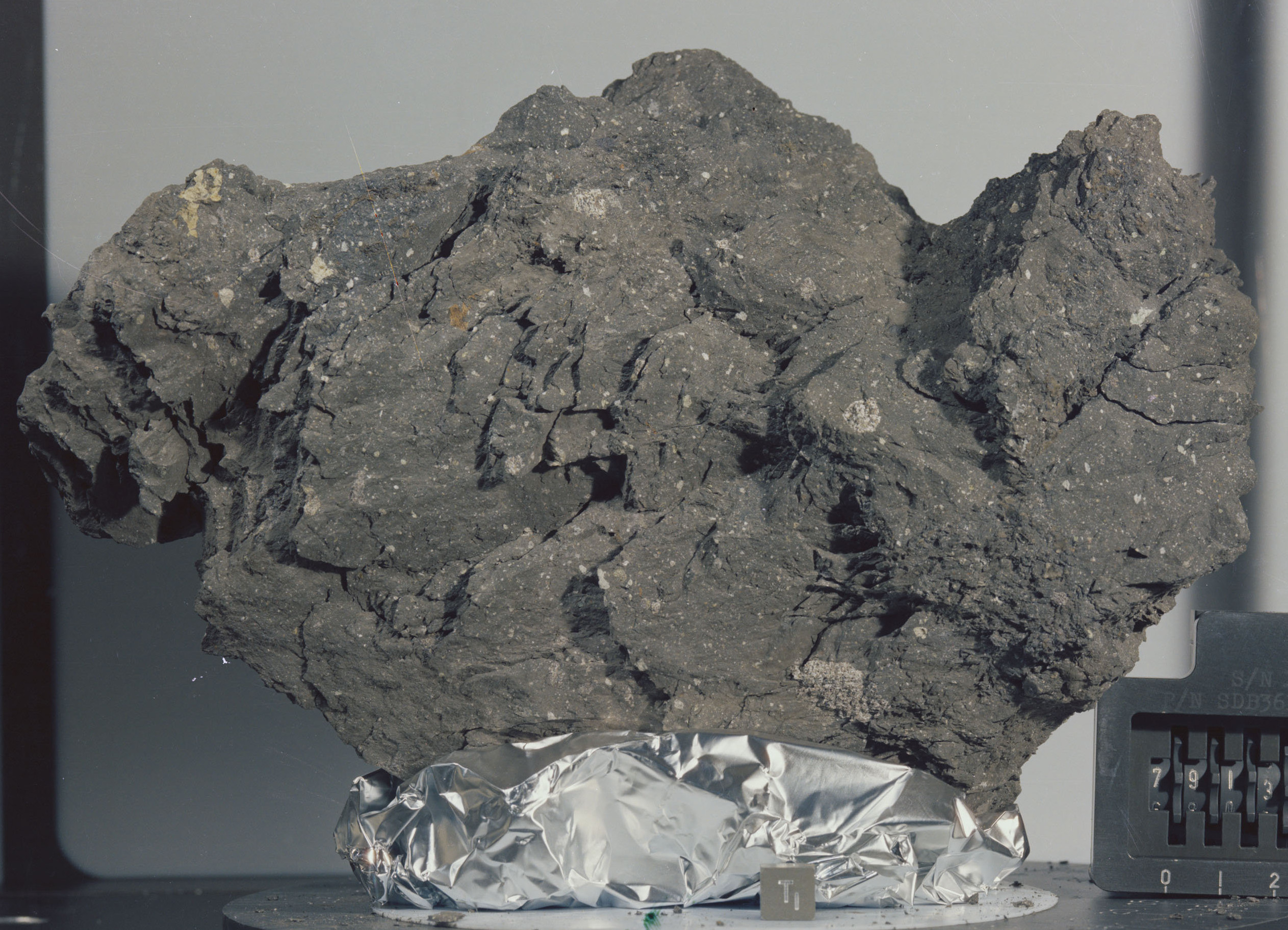
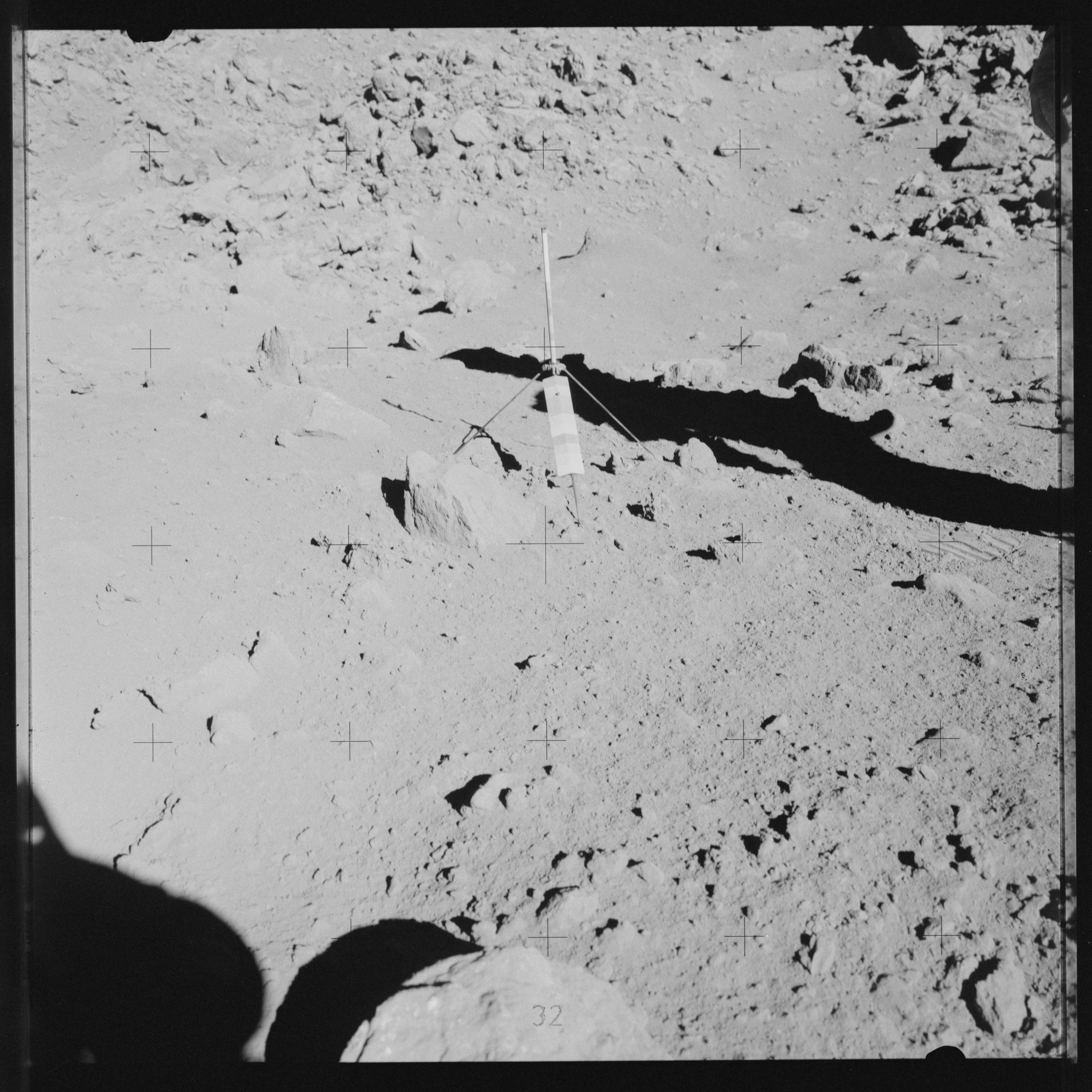
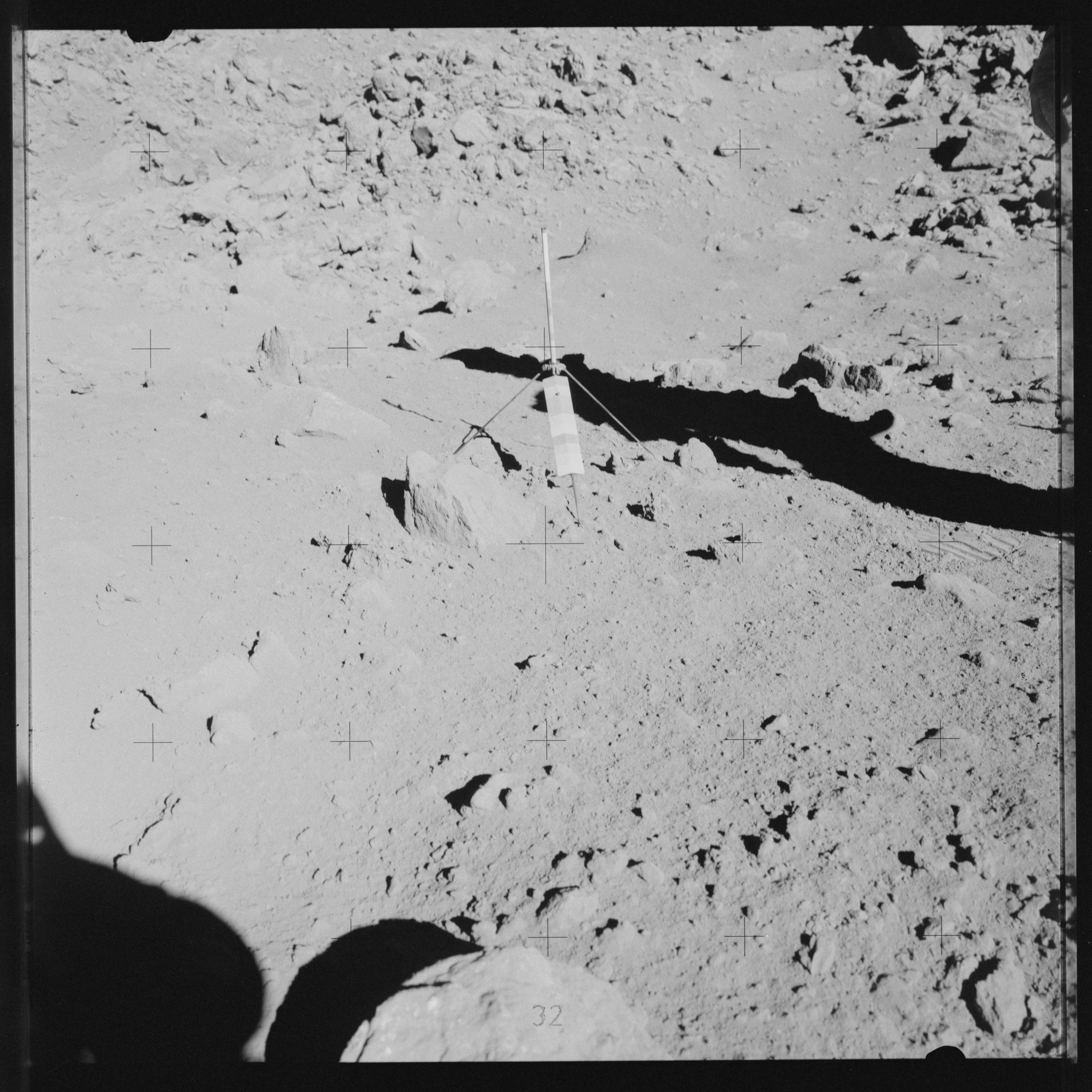
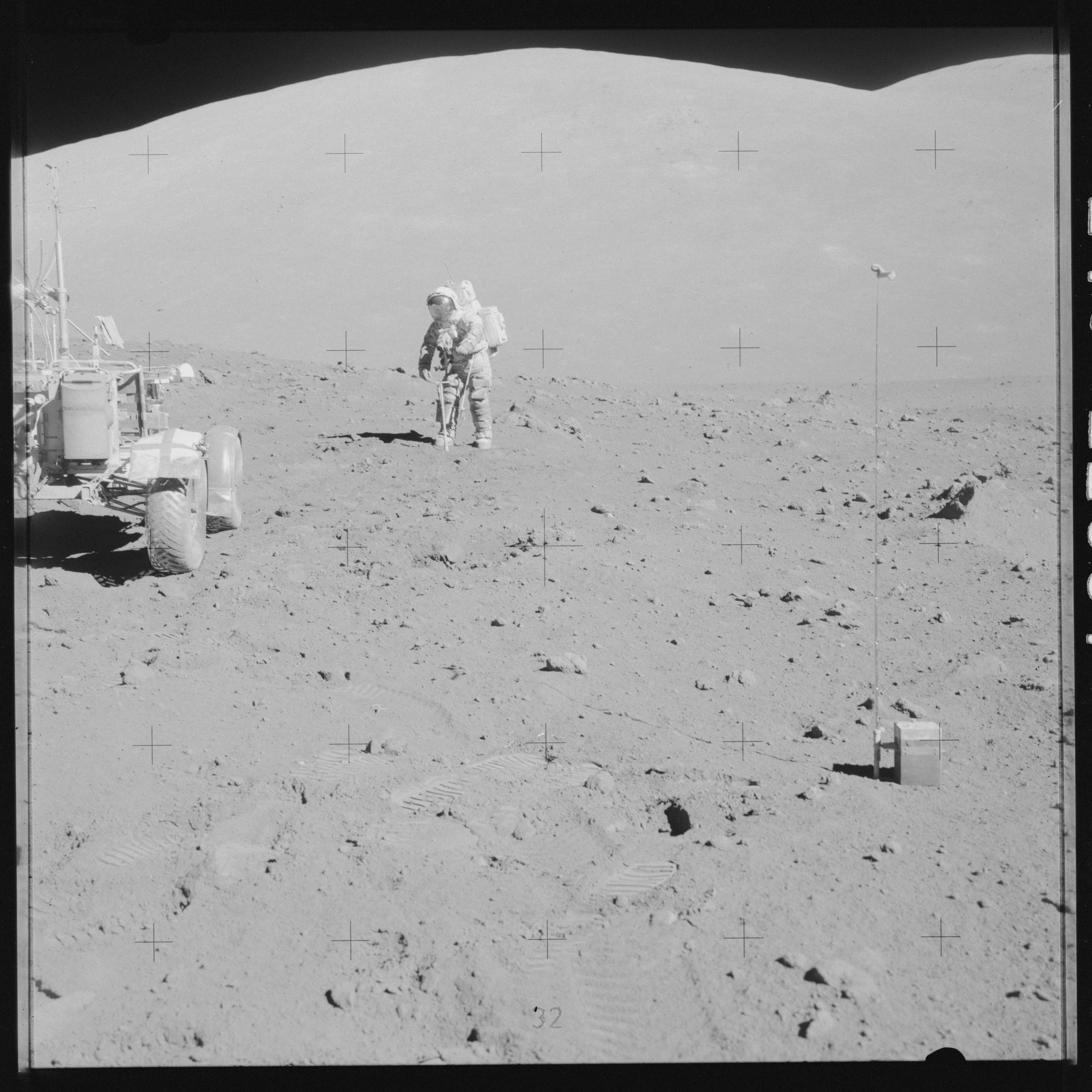
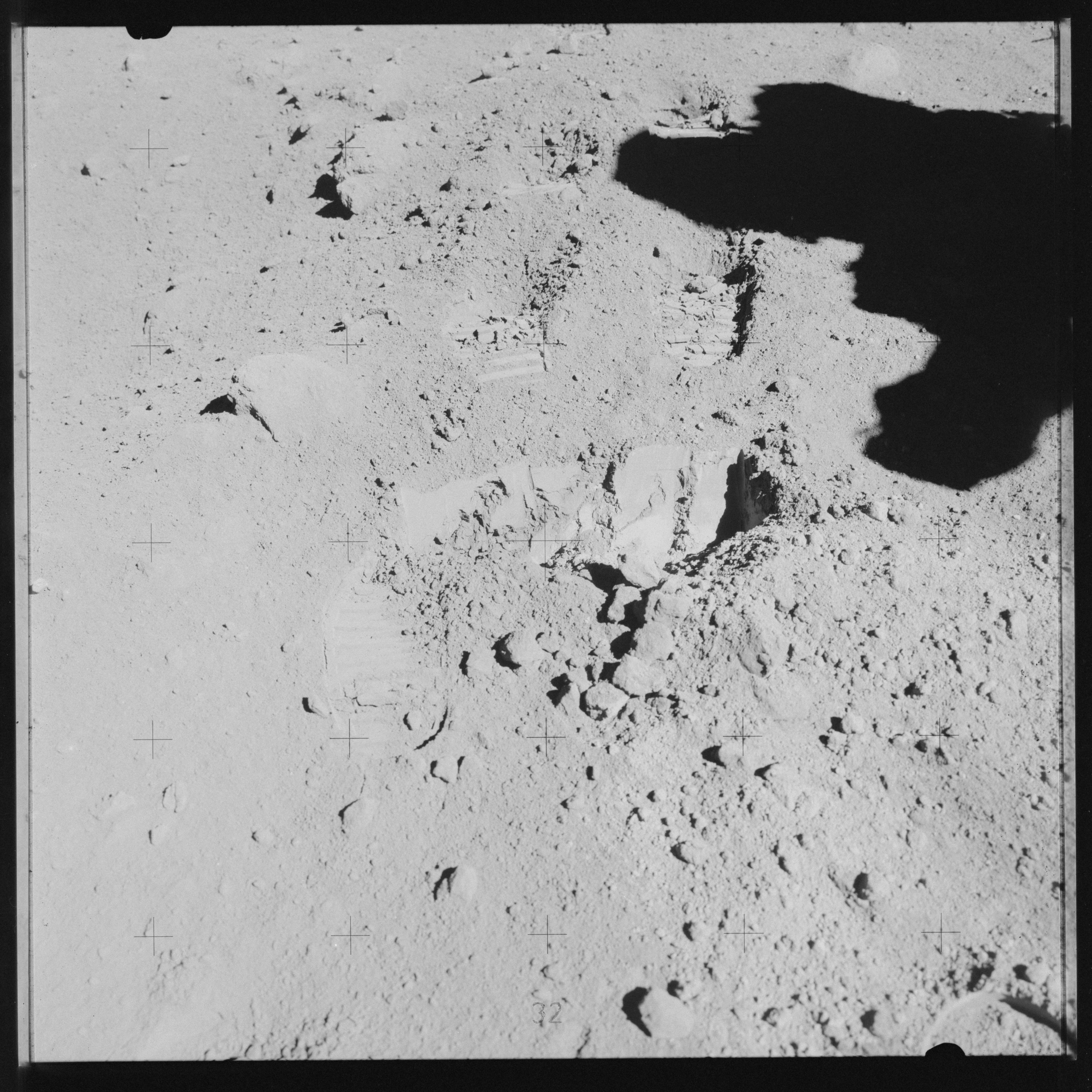
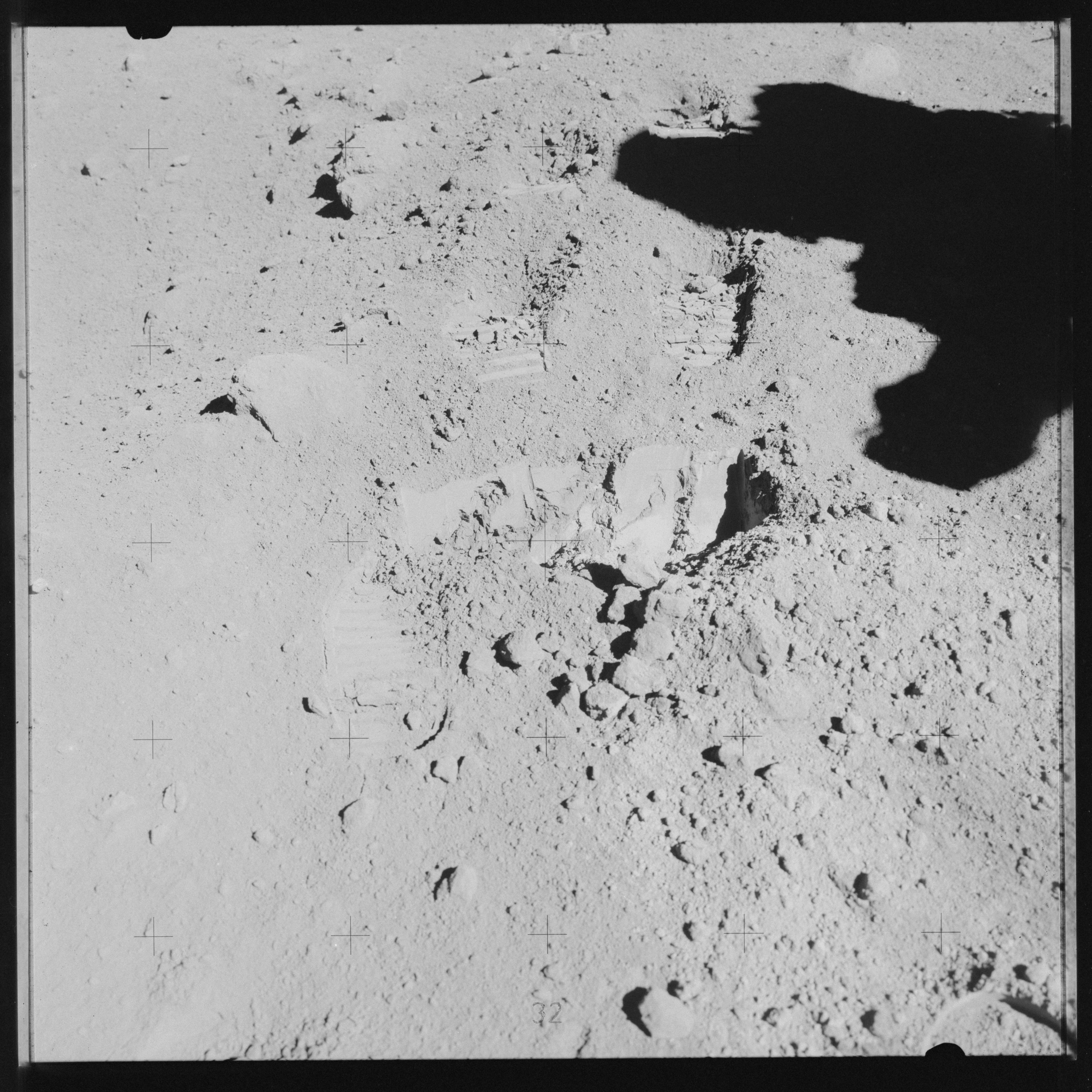
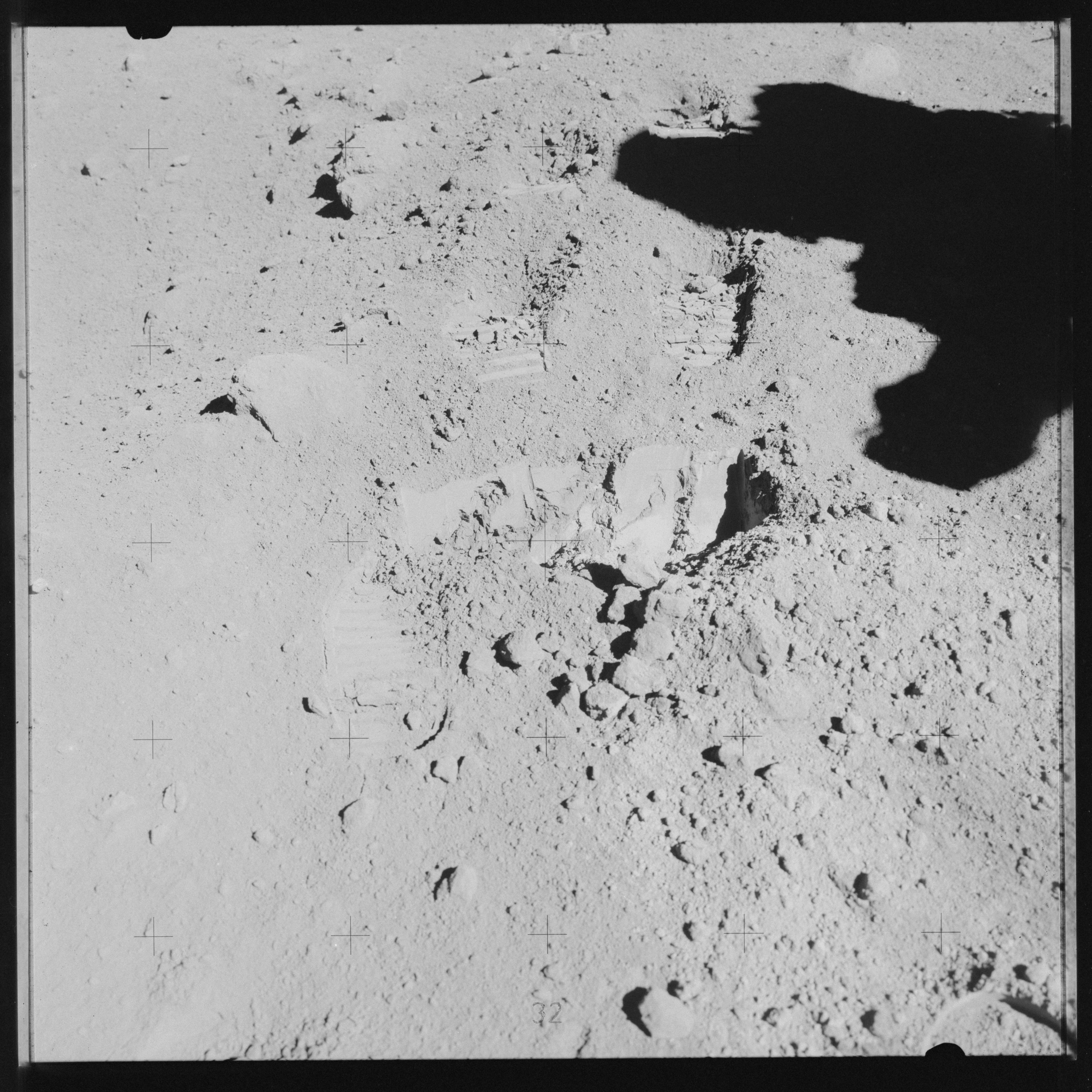
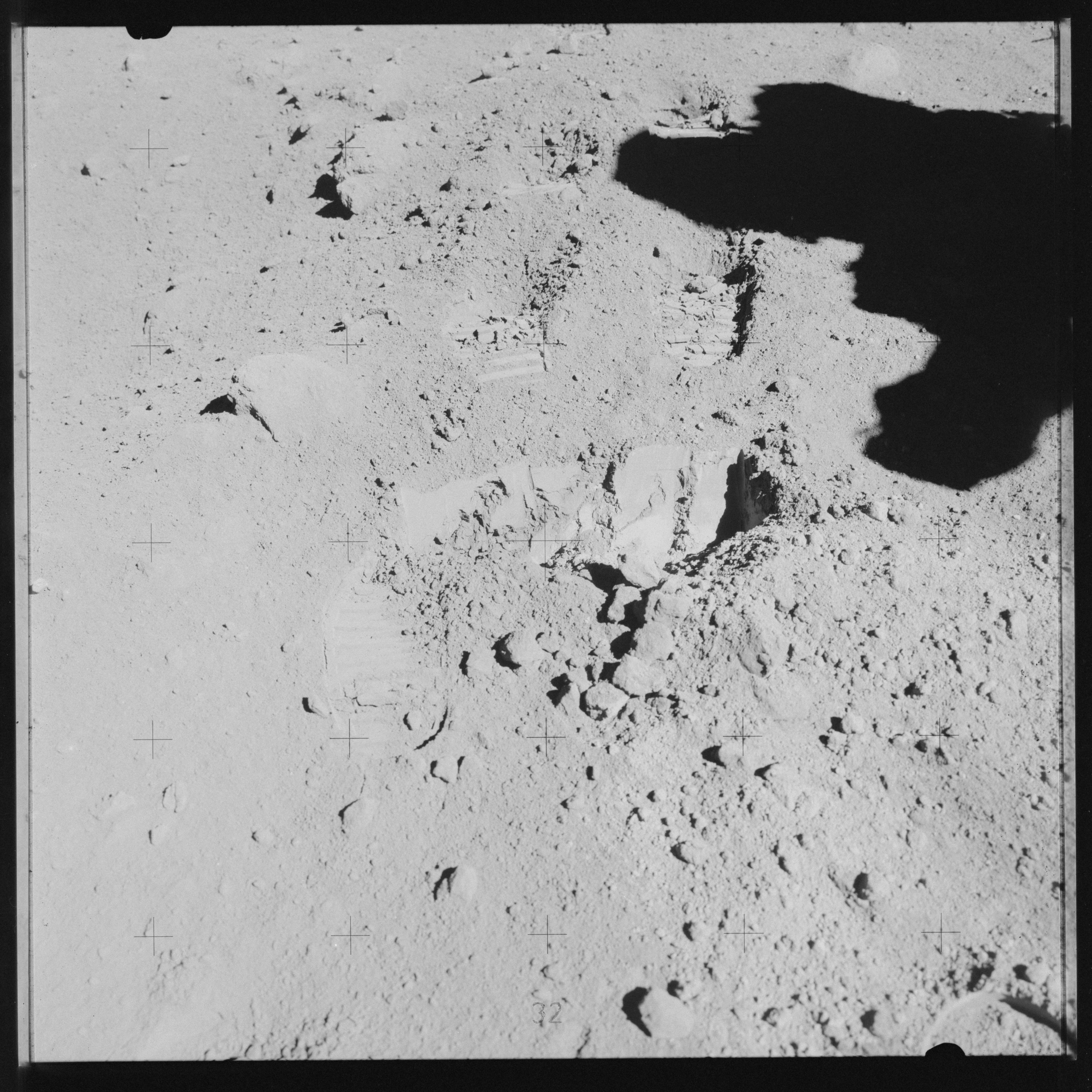
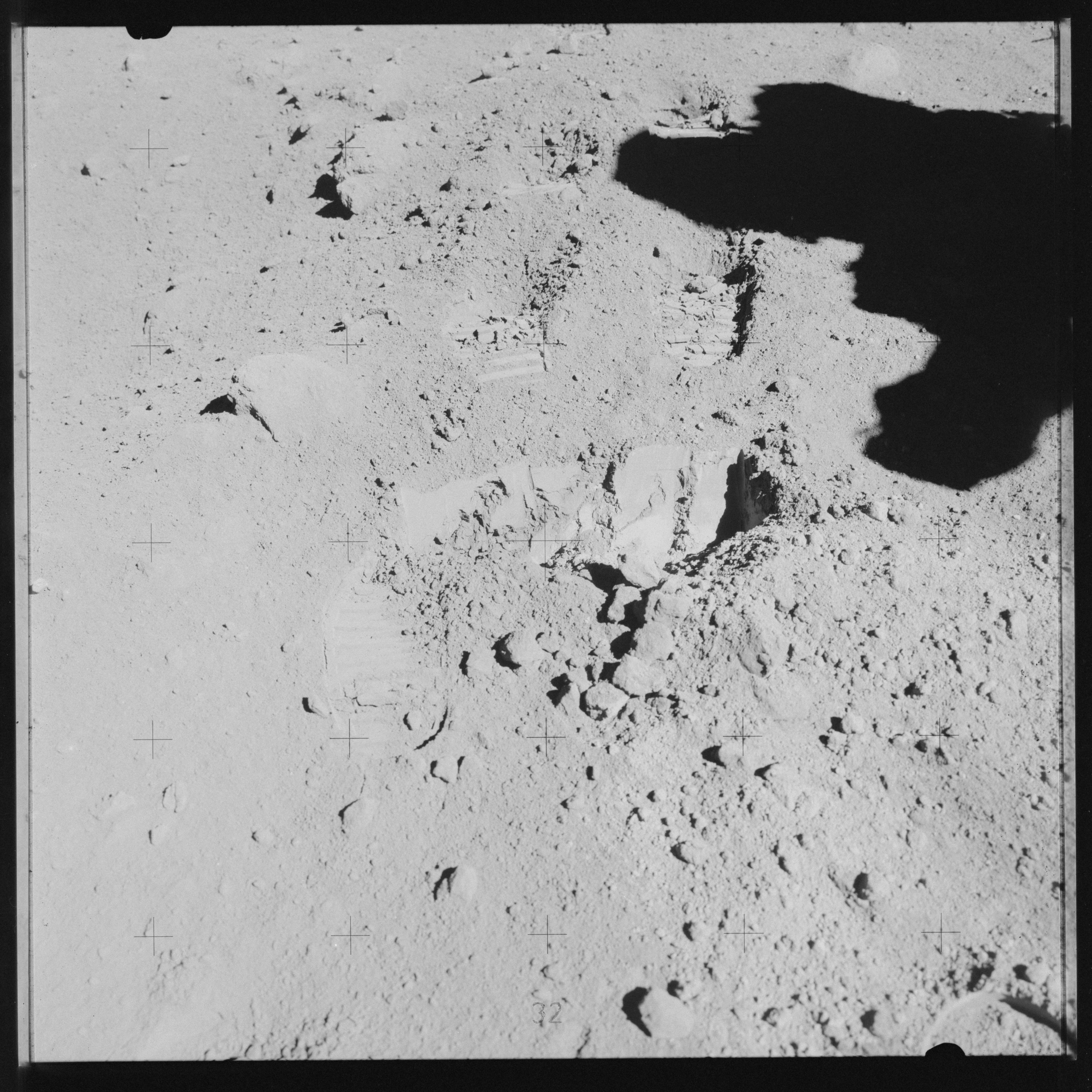
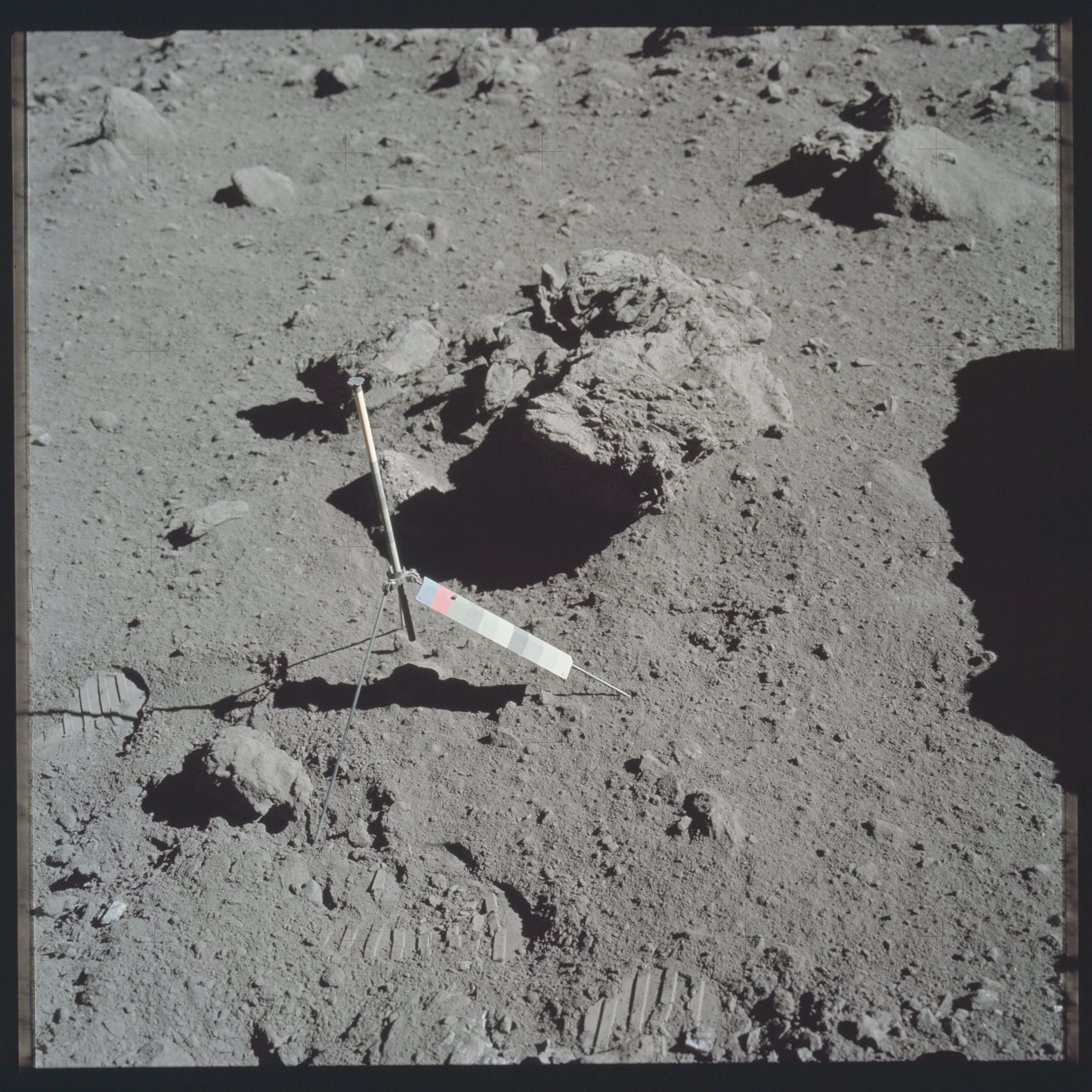
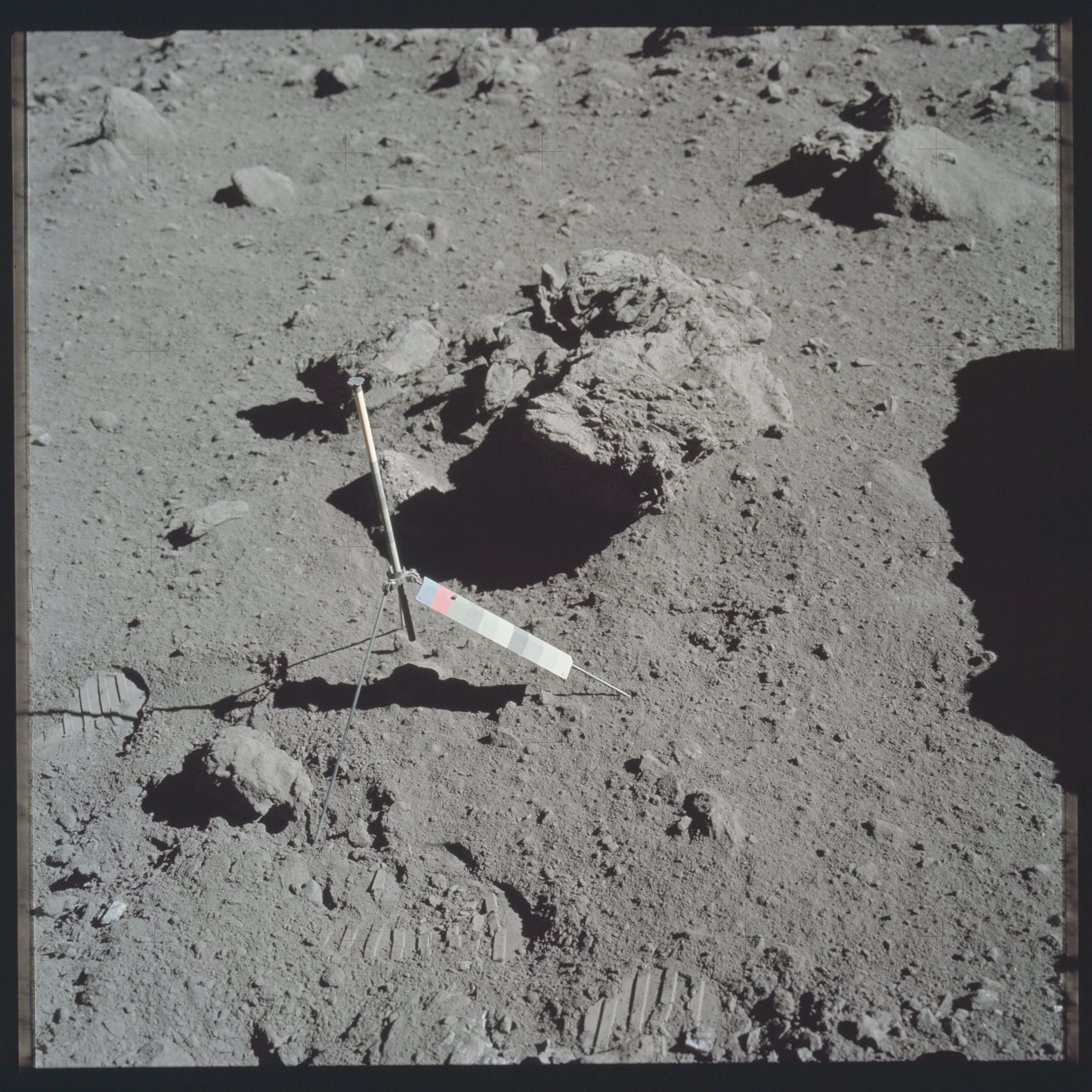
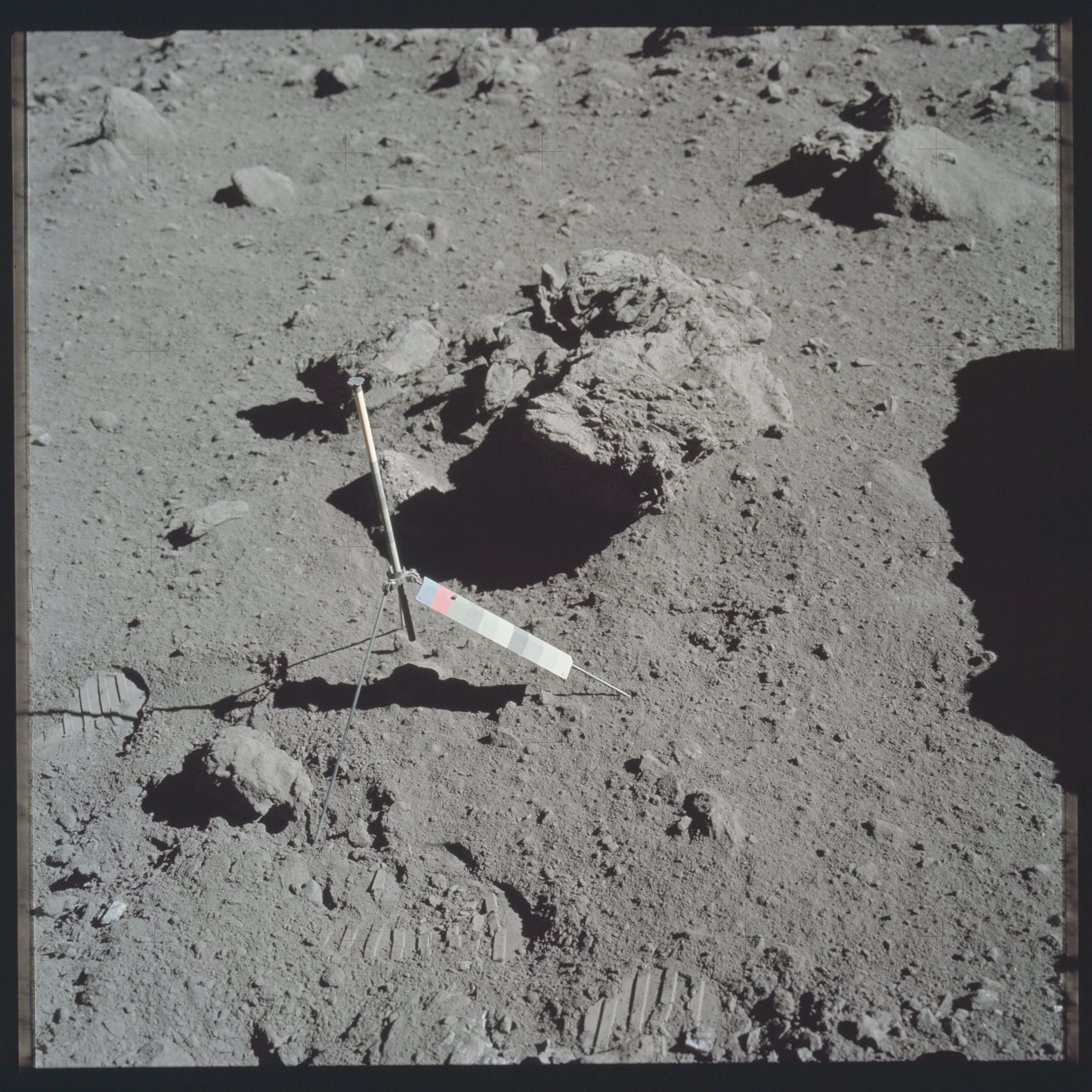
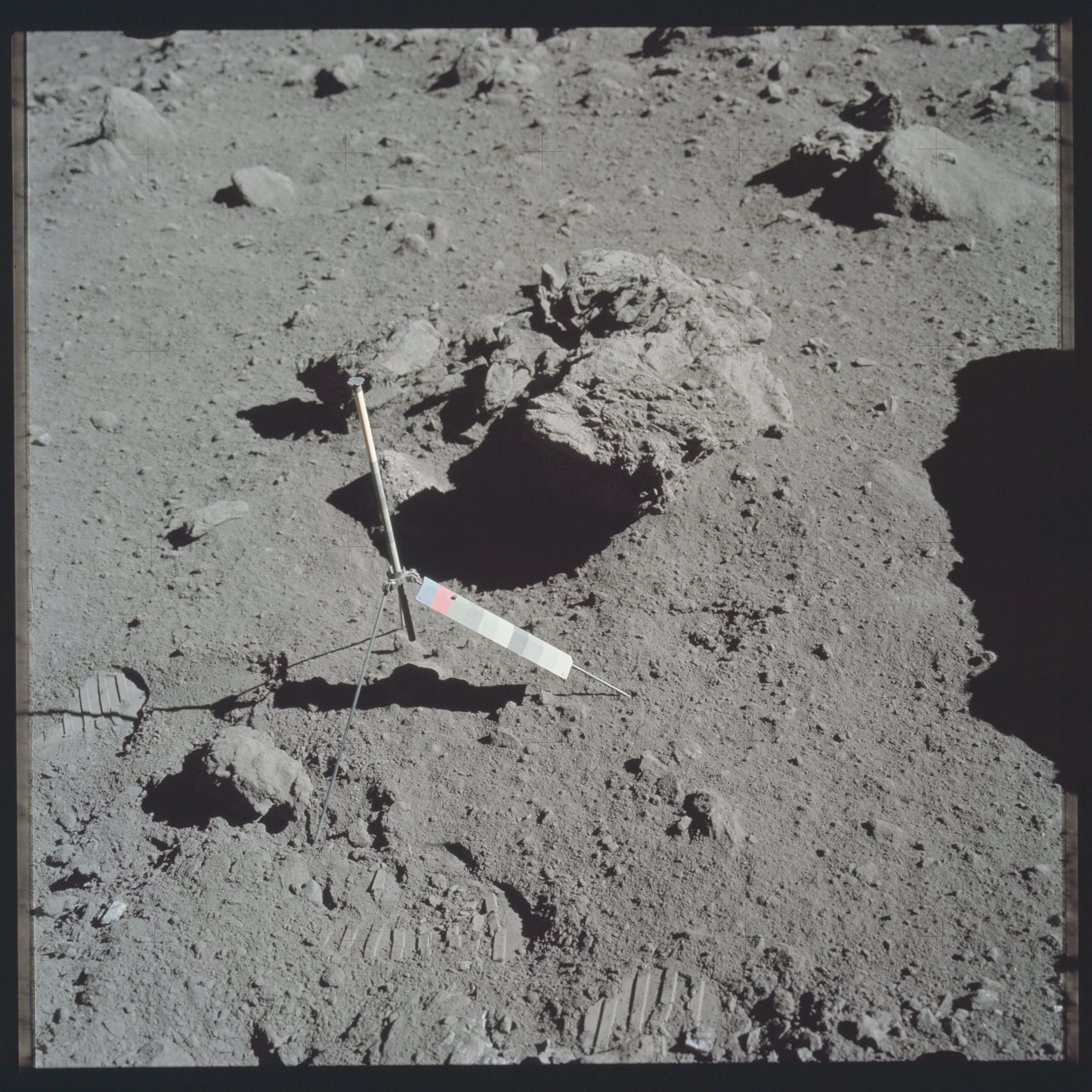
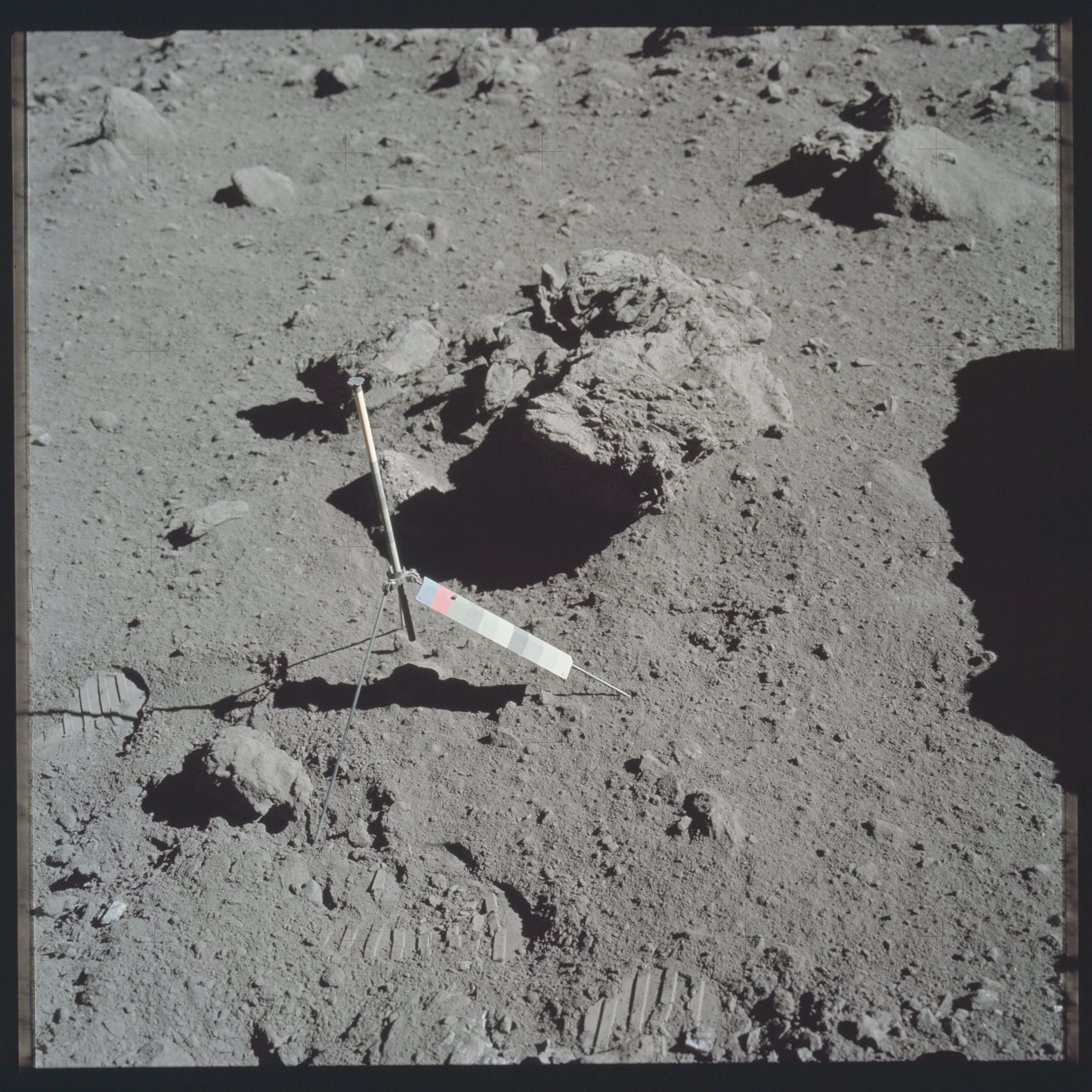
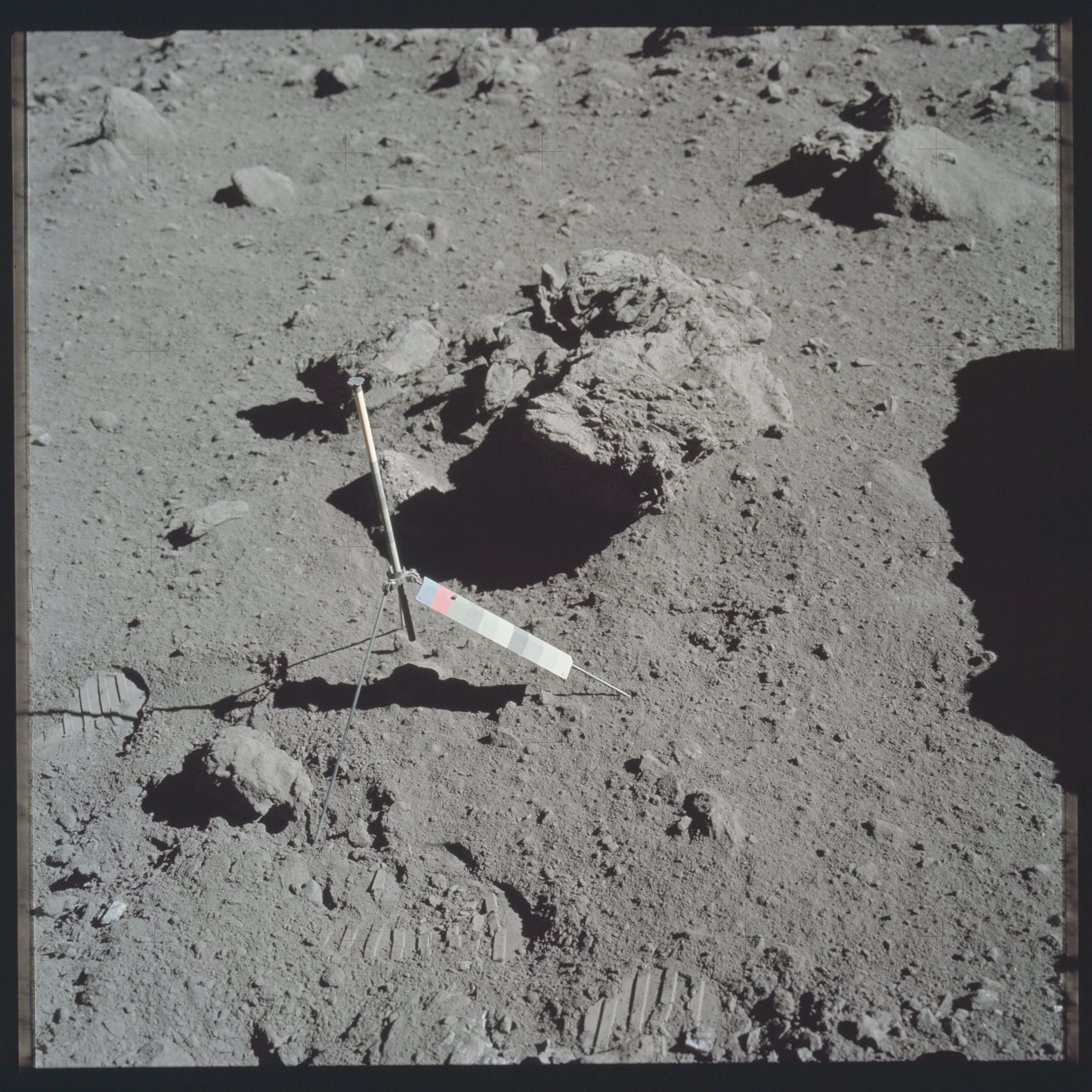
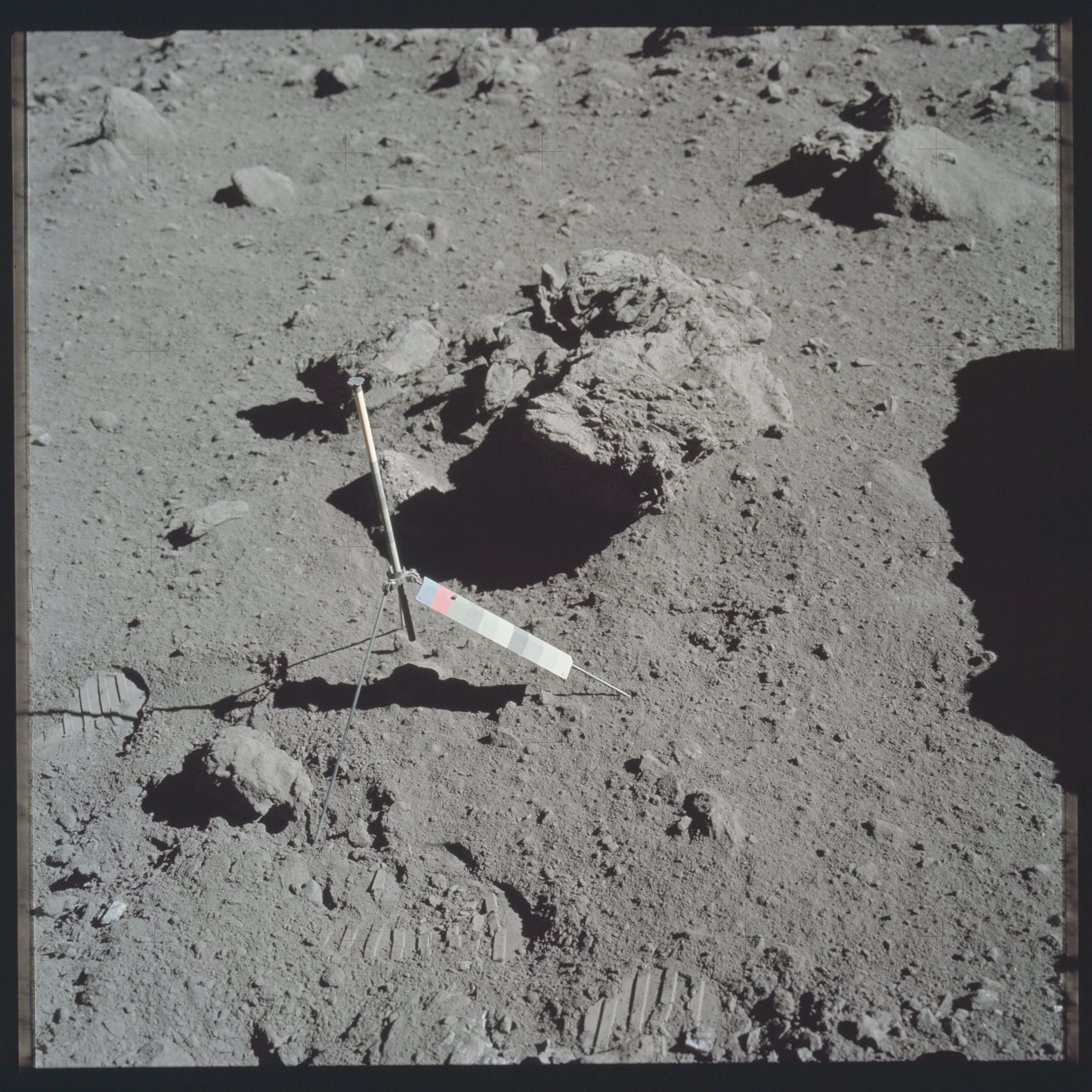
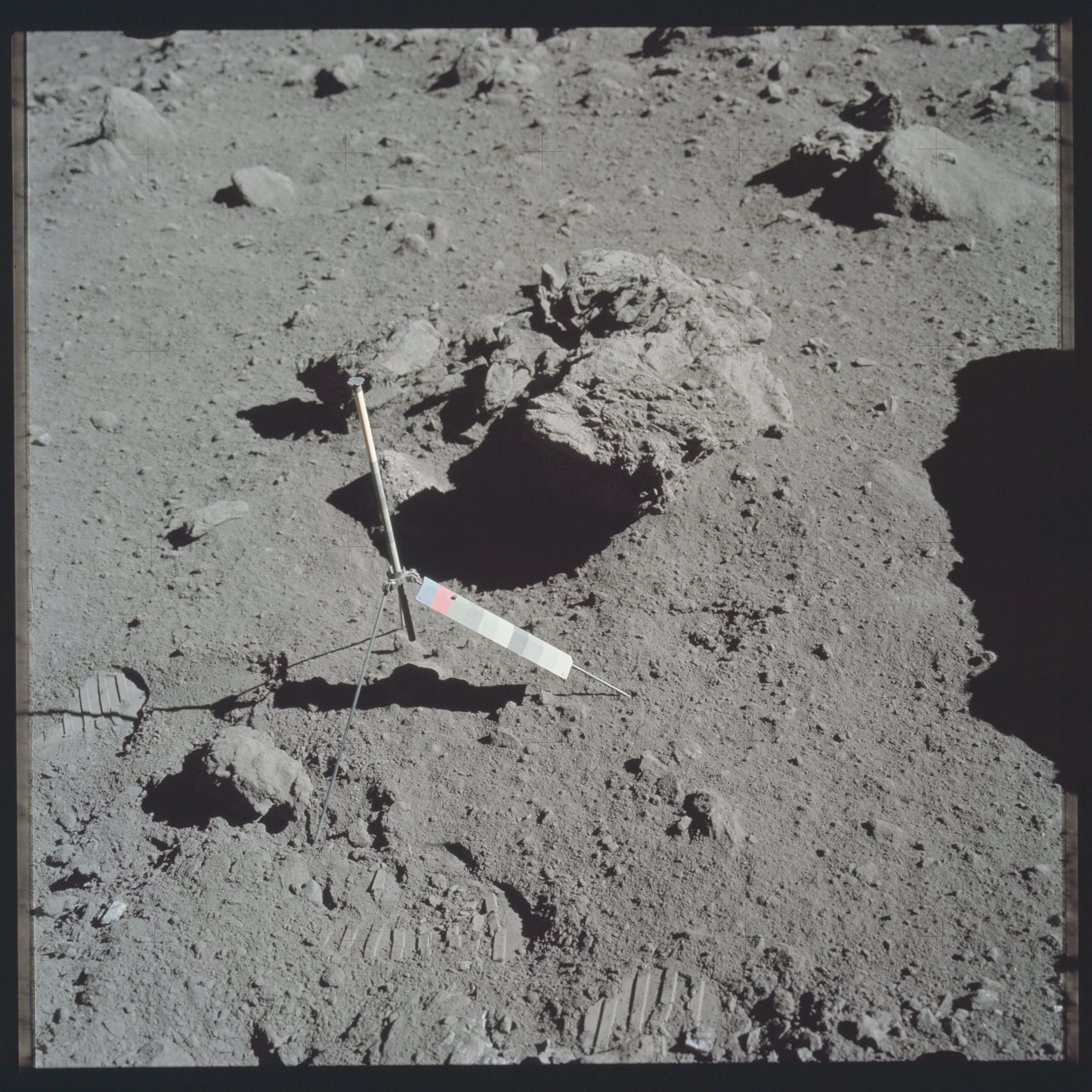
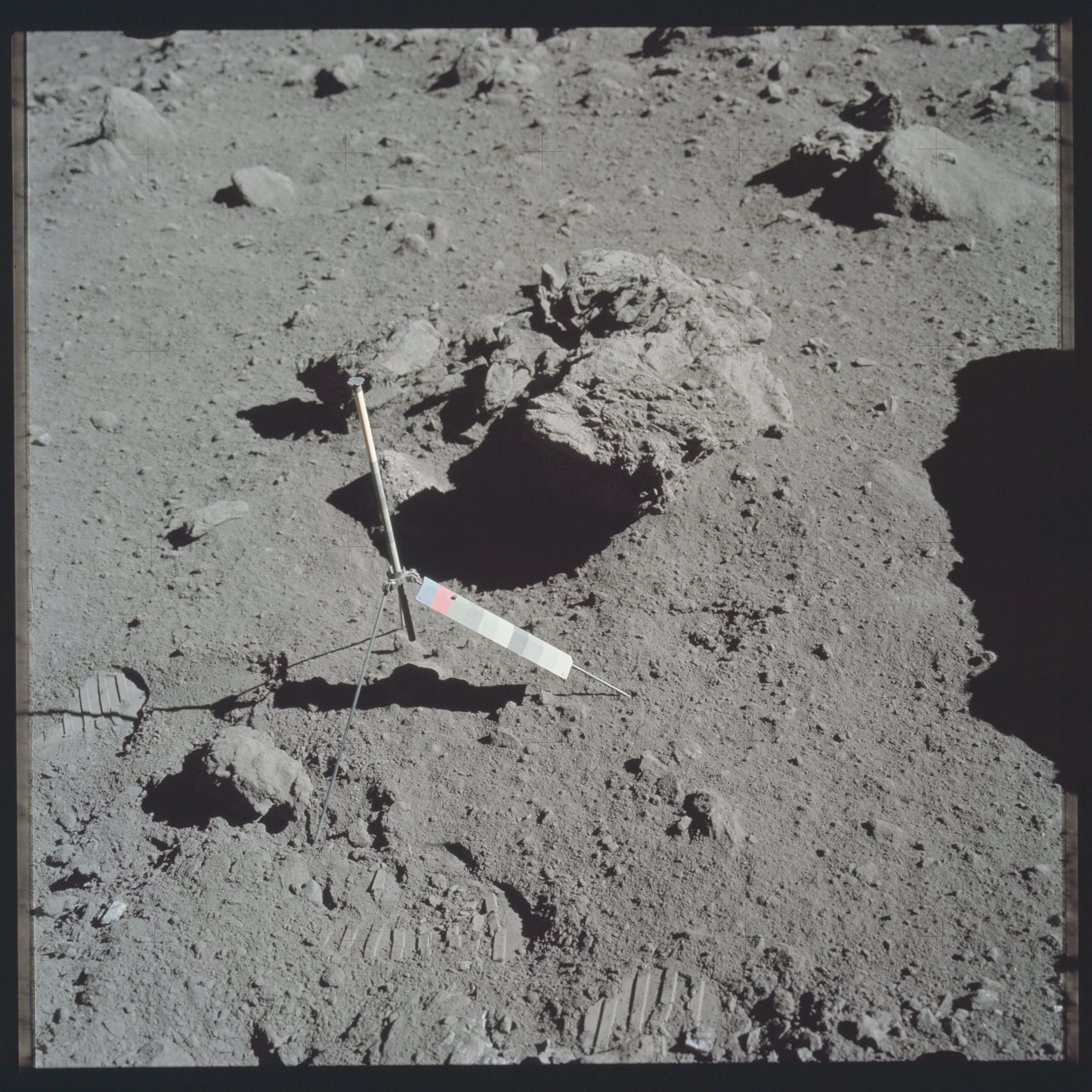
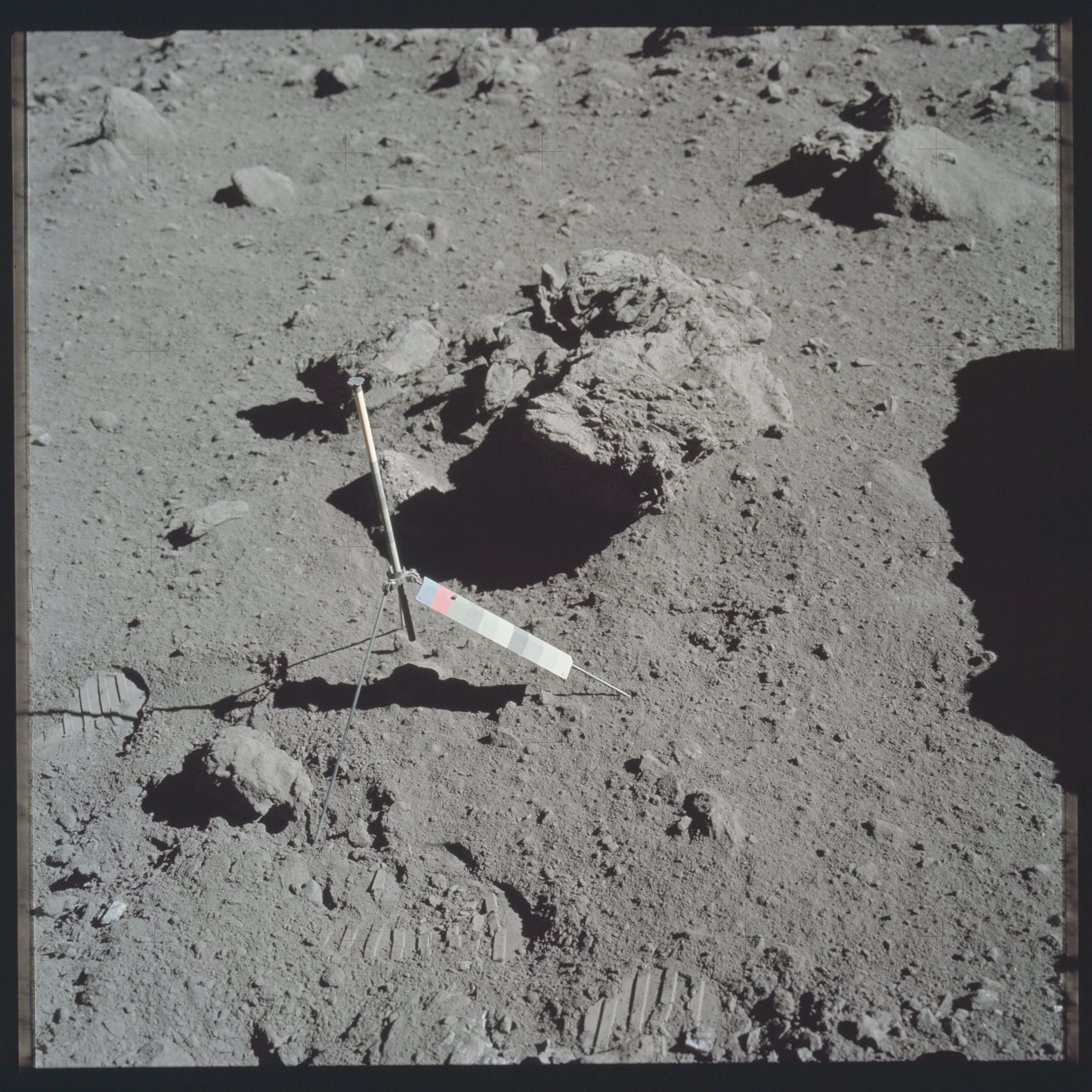
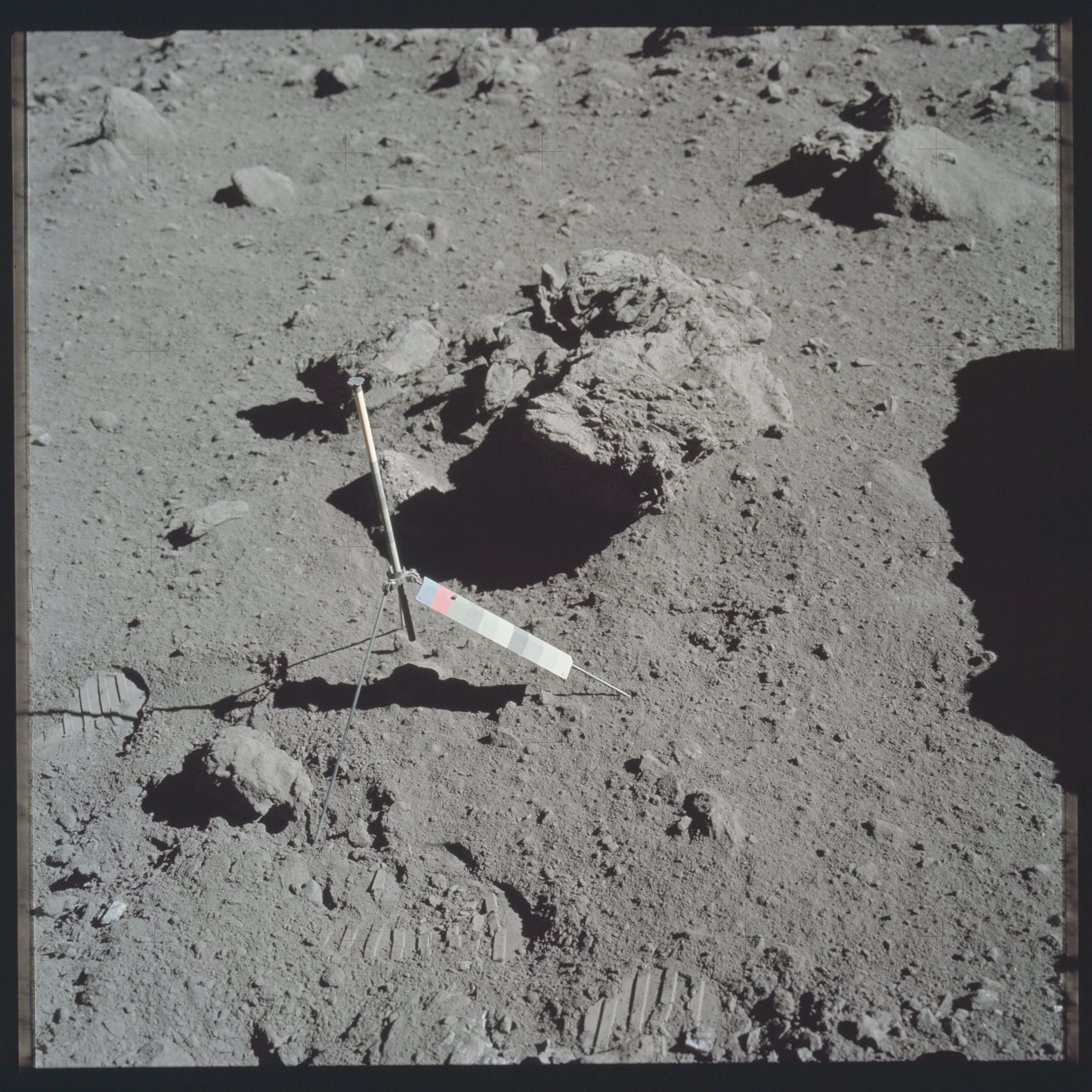
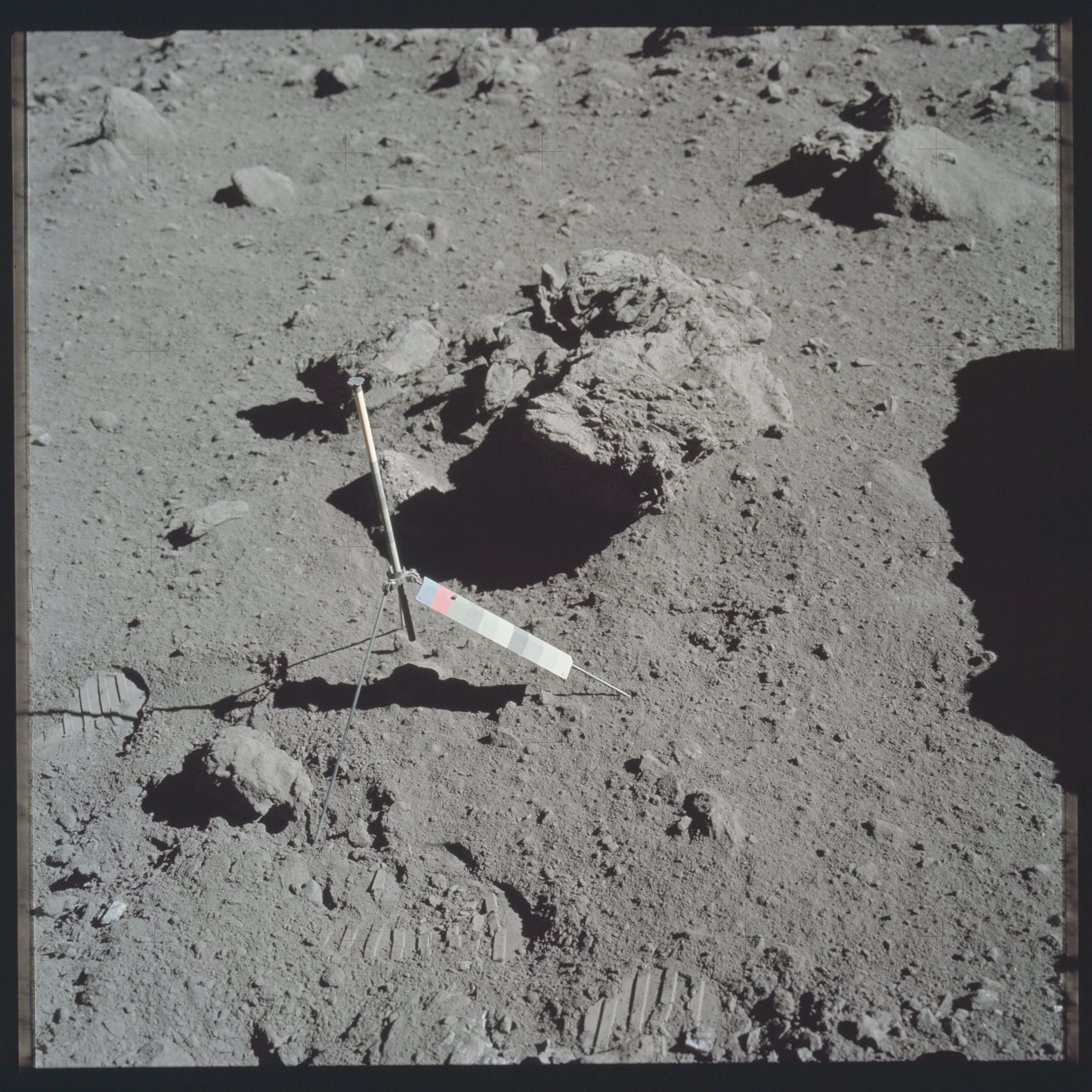
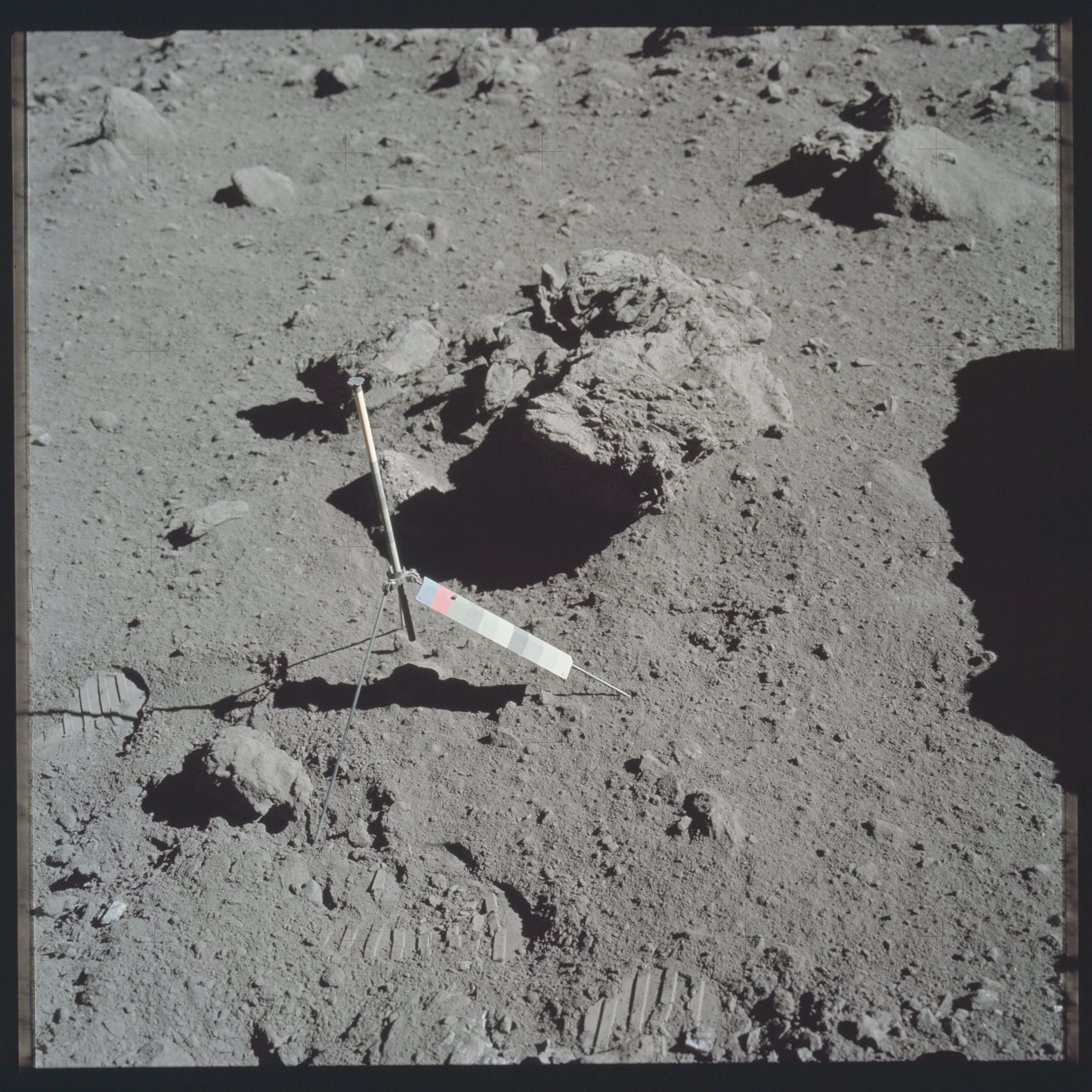
| Sample | In Situ Photo | Rock Type | Lithology | Photo |
| 79002/01 (Double drive tube) | | Regolith | Regolith | - |
| 79035 | | Dark matrix breccia | Soil Breccia | - |
| 79115 | | Dark matrix breccia | Regolith Breccia | - |
| 79125 | | Dark matrix breccia | Microbreccia | - |
| 79135 | | Dark matrix breccia | Regolith Breccia |
| 79155 | - | Coarse basalt | Shocked Basalt | - |
| 79175 | | Agglutinate | Regolith Breccia | - |
| 79195 | | Dark matrix breccia | Regolith Breccia | - |
| 79215 | | Brecciated troctolite | Feldspathic Granulitic Impactite | - |
| 79225 | | Friable dark matrix breccia | Friable Microbreccia | - |
| 79226 | | Friable dark matrix breccia | Friable Microbreccia | - |
| 79227 and 79228 | | Friable clods | Clod | - |
| 79245 | | Crystalline | High Grade Metaclastic | - |
| 79265 | | Fine basalt | High-Ti Mare Basalt | - |
| 79515 | | Medium basalt | Ilmenite Basalt | - |
| 79516 | | Fine basalt | Vitrophyric Ilmenite Basalt | - |
| 79517 | | Dark matrix breccia | Dark Matrix Breccia | - |
| 79518 | | Dark matrix breccia | Dark Matrix Breccia | - |
| 79519 | | Dark matrix breccia | Dark Matrix Breccia | - |
| 79525 | | Dark matrix breccia | Dark Matrix Breccia | - |
| 79526 | | Dark matrix breccia | Dark Matrix Breccia | - |
| 79527 | | Dark matrix breccia | Dark Matrix Breccia | - |
| 79528 | | Dark matrix breccia | Dark Matrix Breccia | - |
| 79529 | | Dark matrix breccia | Dark Matrix Breccia | - |
| 79535 | | Dark matrix breccia | Dark Matrix Breccia | - |
| 79536 | | Dark matrix breccia | Dark Matrix Breccia | - |
| 79537 | | Dark matrix breccia | Dark Matrix Breccia | - |
