= Bowen's reaction series =

Order of crystallization of minerals in magma

Discontinuous; Series (Mafic minerals)	Continuous; Series (Felsic minerals)
Olivine	Plagioclase (Calcium rich)
Pyroxene
Amphibole
Biotite (Black Mica)	Plagioclase (Sodium rich)
Orthoclase (K-feldspar)
Muscovite (White Mica)
Quartz (Felsic mineral)

High (1200°C)
Relative; Crystallization; Temperature
Low (600°C)

Within the field of geology, Bowen's reaction series is the work of the Canadian petrologist Norman L. Bowen, who summarized, based on experiments and observations of natural rocks, the sequence of crystallization of common silicate minerals from typical basaltic magma undergoing fractional crystallization (i.e. crystallization wherein early-formed crystals are removed from the magma by crystal settling, leaving behind a liquid of slightly different composition). Bowen's reaction series is able to explain why certain types of minerals tend to be found together while others are almost never associated with one another. He experimented in the early 1900s with powdered rock material that was heated until it melted and then allowed to cool to a target temperature whereupon he observed the types of minerals that formed in the rocks produced. He repeated this process with progressively cooler temperatures and the results he obtained led him to formulate his reaction series which is still accepted today as the idealized progression of minerals produced by cooling basaltic magma that undergoes fractional crystallization. Based upon Bowen's work, one can infer from the minerals present in a rock the relative conditions under which the material had formed.

== Description ==
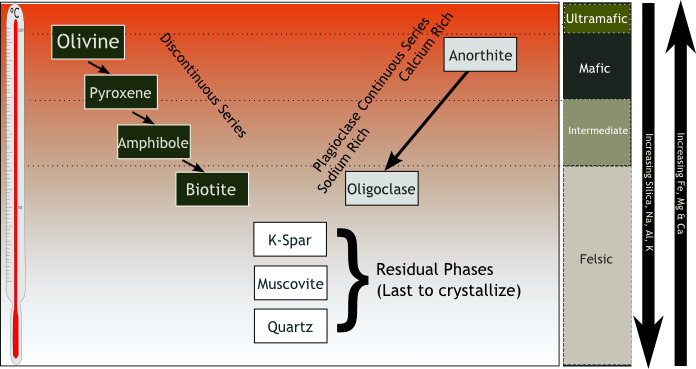
Bowen's reaction series

The series is divided into two branches, the continuous (felsic minerals: feldspars) and the discontinuous (mafic minerals). The minerals at the top of the illustration (given aside) are first to crystallize and so the temperature gradient can be read to be from high to low with the high-temperature minerals being on the top and the low-temperature ones on the bottom. The branch on the right of the illustration is the continuous one (with continuous solid solutions of felsic minerals) and results in progressively sodium-rich plagioclase at lowering temperatures. In the discontinuous series mafic minerals such as olivine will first crystallize at a higher temperature, as magma cools. However, if they are not precipitated (settled) out, the composition of the magma does not change and as the magma further cools the olivine will recrystallise as pyroxene.

Since the surface of the Earth is a low temperature environment compared to the zones of rock formation, the chart also reflects the relative stability of minerals, with the ones at bottom being most stable and the ones at top being quickest to weather, known as the Goldich dissolution series. This is because minerals are most stable in the temperature and pressure conditions closest to those under which they had formed.
