= Powell (crater) =

Lunar crater near the Apollo 17 landing site

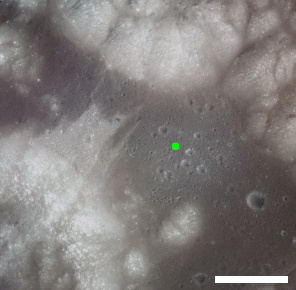
- Location of Powell crater in Taurus–Littrow valley. South Massif is at lower left, North Massif is at top center, and Sculptured Hills are at upper right. Scale bar is 5 km
- Coordinates: 20.16°N 30.76°E
- Diameter: 400 m
- Eponym: Astronaut-named feature

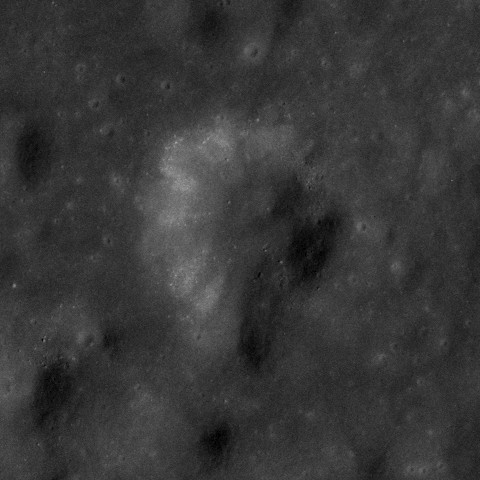
Apollo 17 panoramic camera image

Powell is a feature on Earth's Moon, a crater in Taurus–Littrow valley. Astronauts Eugene Cernan and Harrison Schmitt landed less than 1 km northeast of it in 1972, on the Apollo 17 mission, but they did not visit it.

To the north of Powell is Trident and the landing site. To the northwest are Camelot and Horatio, and to the northeast is Sherlock. Steno and Emory are to the southeast.

The crater was named by the astronauts after John Wesley Powell, geologist and explorer of the American West.
