= Steno-Apollo =

Crater on the Moon

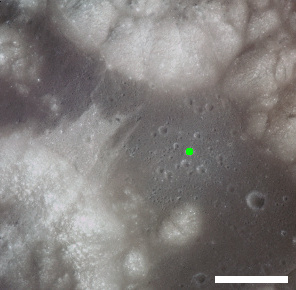
- Location of Steno-Apollo crater in Taurus-Littrow Valley. South Massif is at lower left, North Massif is at top center, and Sculptured Hills are at upper right. Scale bar is 5 km
- Coordinates: 20.15°N 30.79°E
- Diameter: 520 m
- Eponym: Astronaut-named feature

Steno-Apollo is a feature on Earth's Moon, a crater in Taurus-Littrow valley. Astronauts Eugene Cernan and Harrison Schmitt visited it in 1972, on the Apollo 17 mission. The astronauts referred to it simply as Steno during the mission. The north rim of Steno is Geology Station 1 of the mission.

To the south of Steno is Emory, to the northwest are Trident and Powell, and to the northeast is Sherlock.

The crater was named by the astronauts after the Danish geologist Nicolas Steno.

== Gallery ==
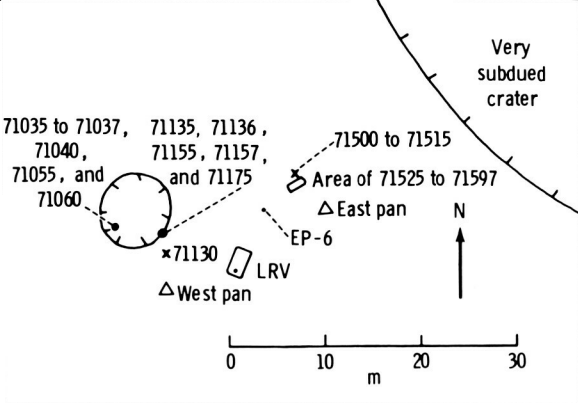
Planimetric map of Station 1, near the northwest rim of Steno.

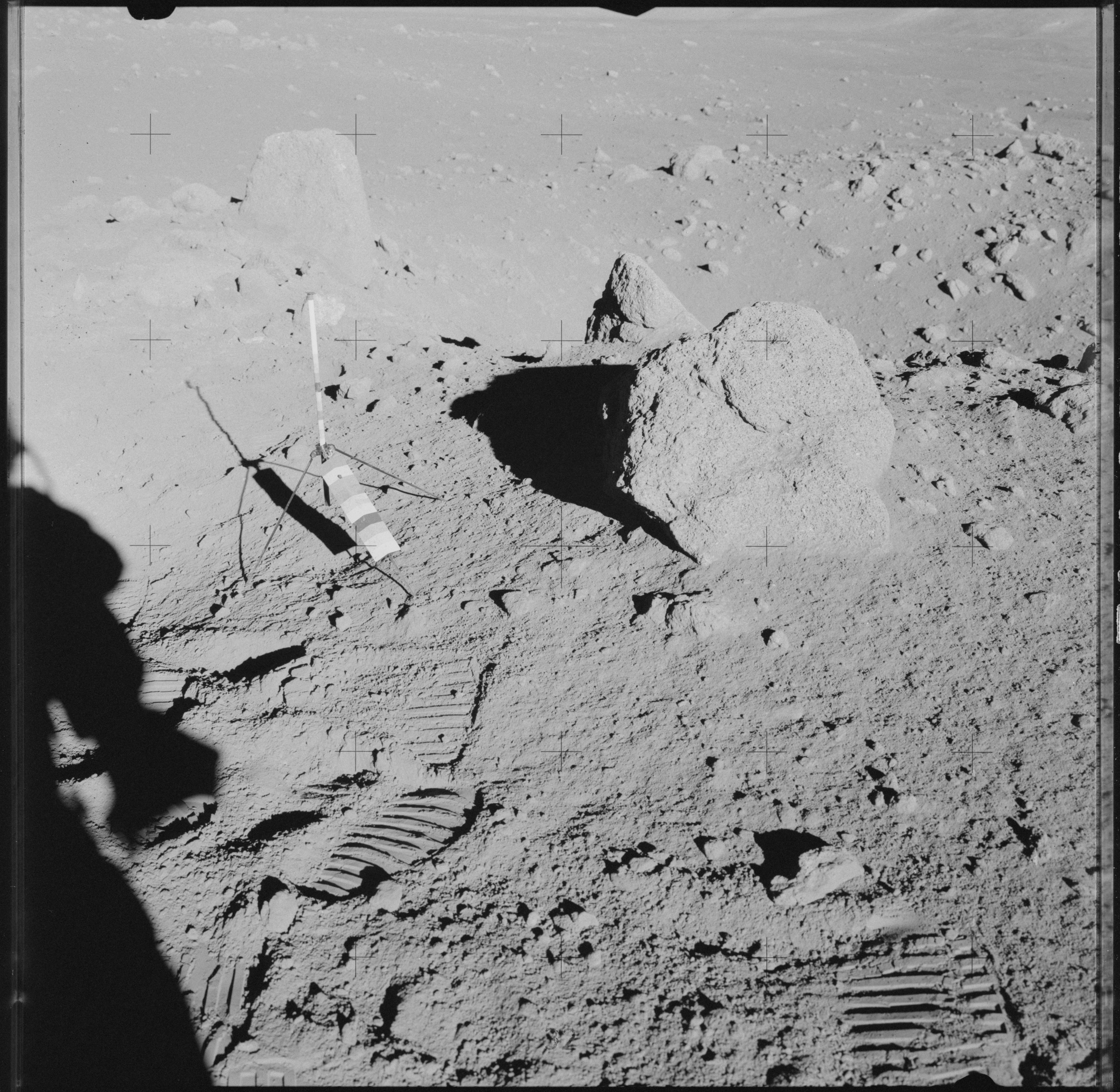
Many of the samples collected at Station 1 were collected from boulders in this photograph (AS17-136-20741)

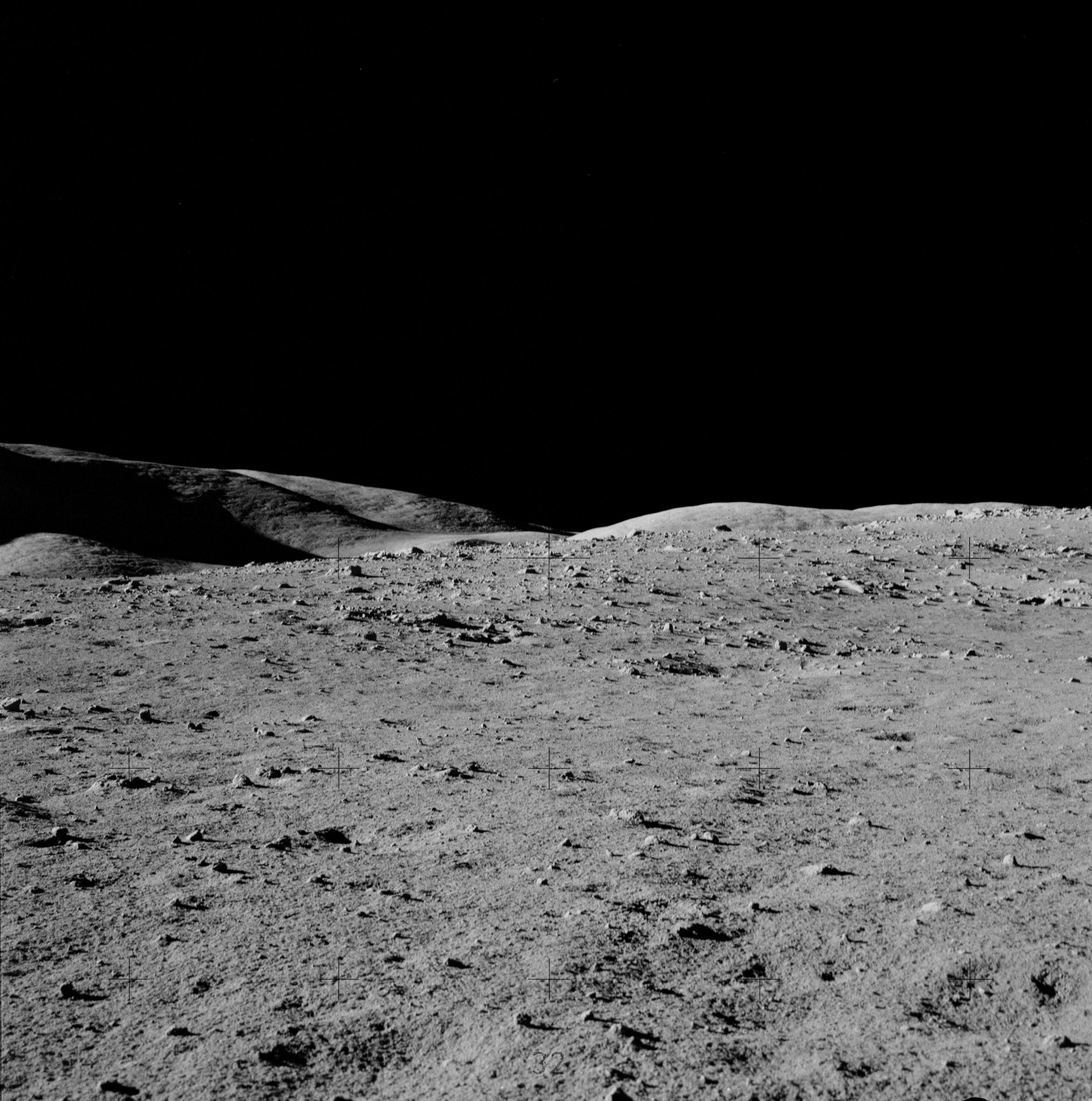
Photo taken from Geology Station 1 of the rim of Steno crater, at the near horizon.

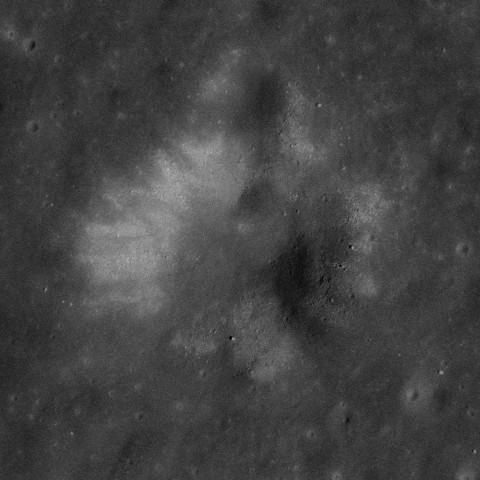
Apollo 17 panoramic camera image
