= Trident (crater) =

Crater on the Moon

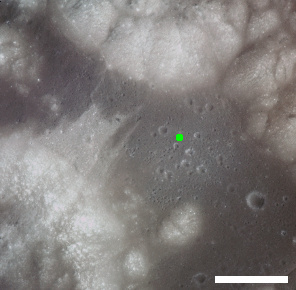
- Location of Trident crater in Taurus-Littrow Valley. South Massif is at lower left, North Massif is at top center, and Sculptured Hills are at upper right. Scale bar is 5 km
- Coordinates: 20.18°N 30.77°E
- Diameter: 560 m
- Eponym: Astronaut-named feature

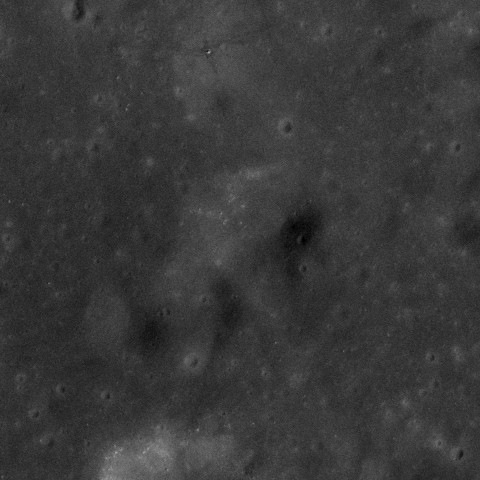
Apollo 17 panoramic camera image. Note that the lunar module Challenger is visible as a bright pixel near top center.

Trident is a feature on Earth's Moon, a crater in Taurus-Littrow valley. Astronauts Eugene Cernan and Harrison Schmitt landed about 300 m north of its rim in 1972, on the Apollo 17 mission. They drove along the east rim of Trident during EVA 1 of the mission, in their rover.

To the south of Trident is Powell, to the west are Camelot and Horatio, and to the east is Sherlock.

The crater was named by the astronauts after a trident (three pronged spear) due to its shape.
