= Victory (crater) =

Crater on the Moon

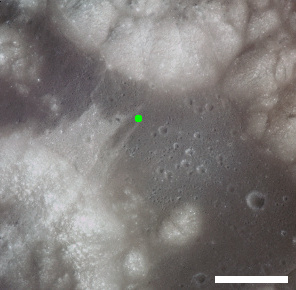
- Location of Victory crater in Taurus–Littrow valley. South Massif is at lower left, North Massif is at top center, and Sculptured Hills are at upper right. Scale bar is 5 km
- Coordinates: 20.22°N 30.67°E
- Diameter: 510 m
- Eponym: Astronaut-named feature

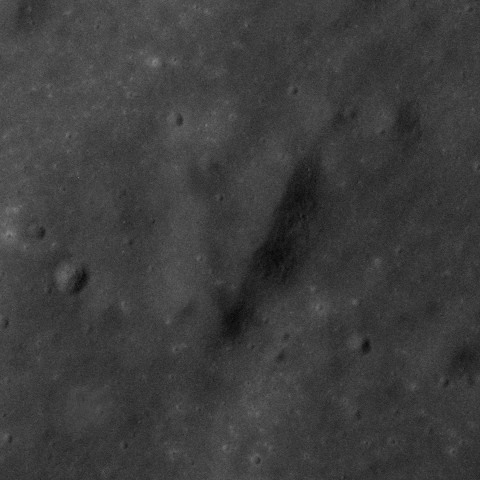
Apollo 17 panoramic camera image

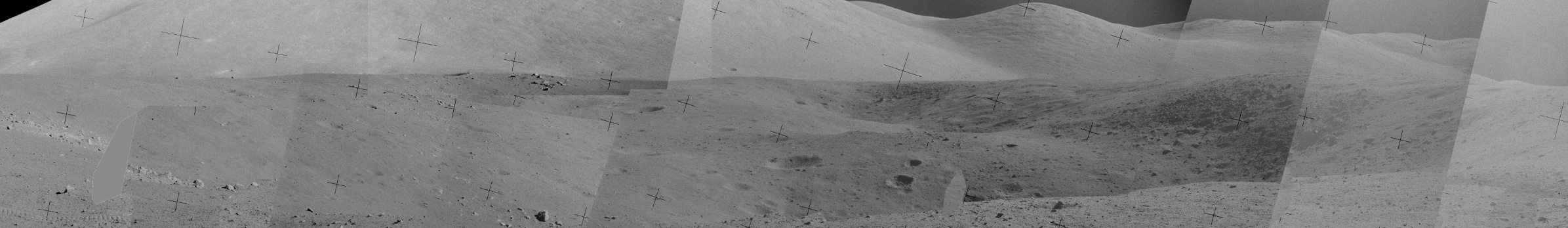
Mosaic of Apollo 17 images of Victory crater, facing north at center

Victory is a feature on Earth's Moon, a crater in Taurus–Littrow valley. Astronauts Eugene Cernan and Harrison Schmitt visited it in 1972, on the Apollo 17 mission, during EVA 2. The astronauts stopped at the south rim of Victory on their way back to the Lunar Module from Shorty crater.

To the west of Victory is Shorty crater and to the east are Camelot and Horatio, as well as the landing site itself. To the south is Brontë.

The crater was named by the astronauts honoring Winston Churchill, who delivered the famous 'Victory' speech in 1940.

Station LRV-7 was on the rim of Victory. Samples 75110 through 75115 were collected there.
