= Camelot (crater) =

Lunar impact crater

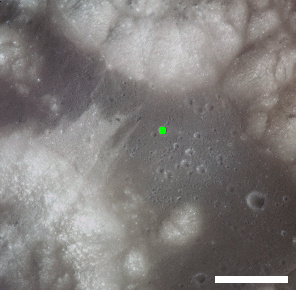
- Location of Camelot crater in Taurus-Littrow Valley. South Massif is at lower left, North Massif is at top center, and Sculptured Hills are at upper right. Scale bar is 5 km
- Coordinates: 20.19°N 30.73°E
- Diameter: 610 m
- Eponym: Astronaut-named feature

Camelot is a feature on Earth's Moon, a crater in Taurus-Littrow valley. Astronauts Eugene Cernan and Harrison Schmitt visited it in 1972, on the Apollo 17 mission, during EVA 2. Geology Station 5 was along the south rim of Camelot.

Camelot is due 700 meters west of the landing site. The smaller Horatio crater is to the southwest, and Victory is to the northwest. Powell and Trident are to the southeast.

The crater was named by the astronauts after the castle Camelot of Arthurian legend.

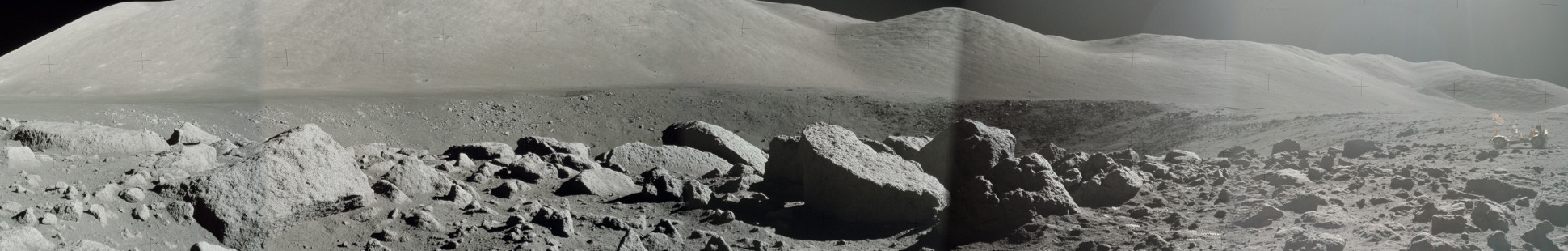
Panorama taken by Eugene Cernan from the south rim of Camelot, at Geology Station 5 (part of the "West pan" in the map below")

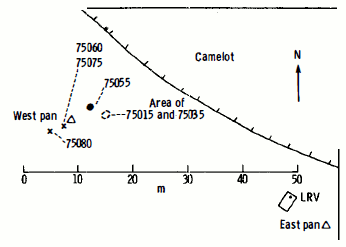
Planimetric map of station 5

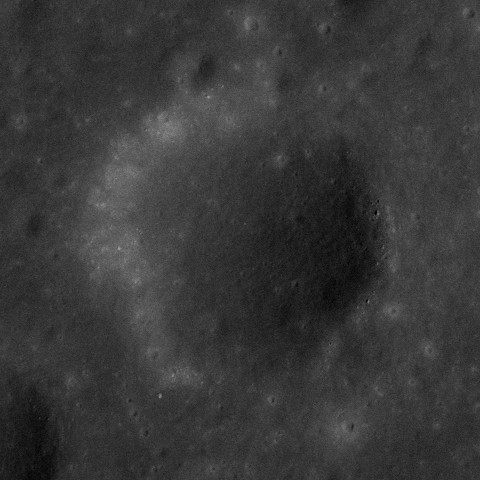
Apollo 17 panoramic camera image

== Samples ==
The following samples were collected from Camelot crater (Station 5), as listed in Table 7-I of the Apollo 17 Preliminary Science Report. The "Rock Type" is from the table, and the "Lithology" is from the Lunar Sample Compendium of the Lunar and Planetary Institute or NASA's Lunar Sample Catalog.

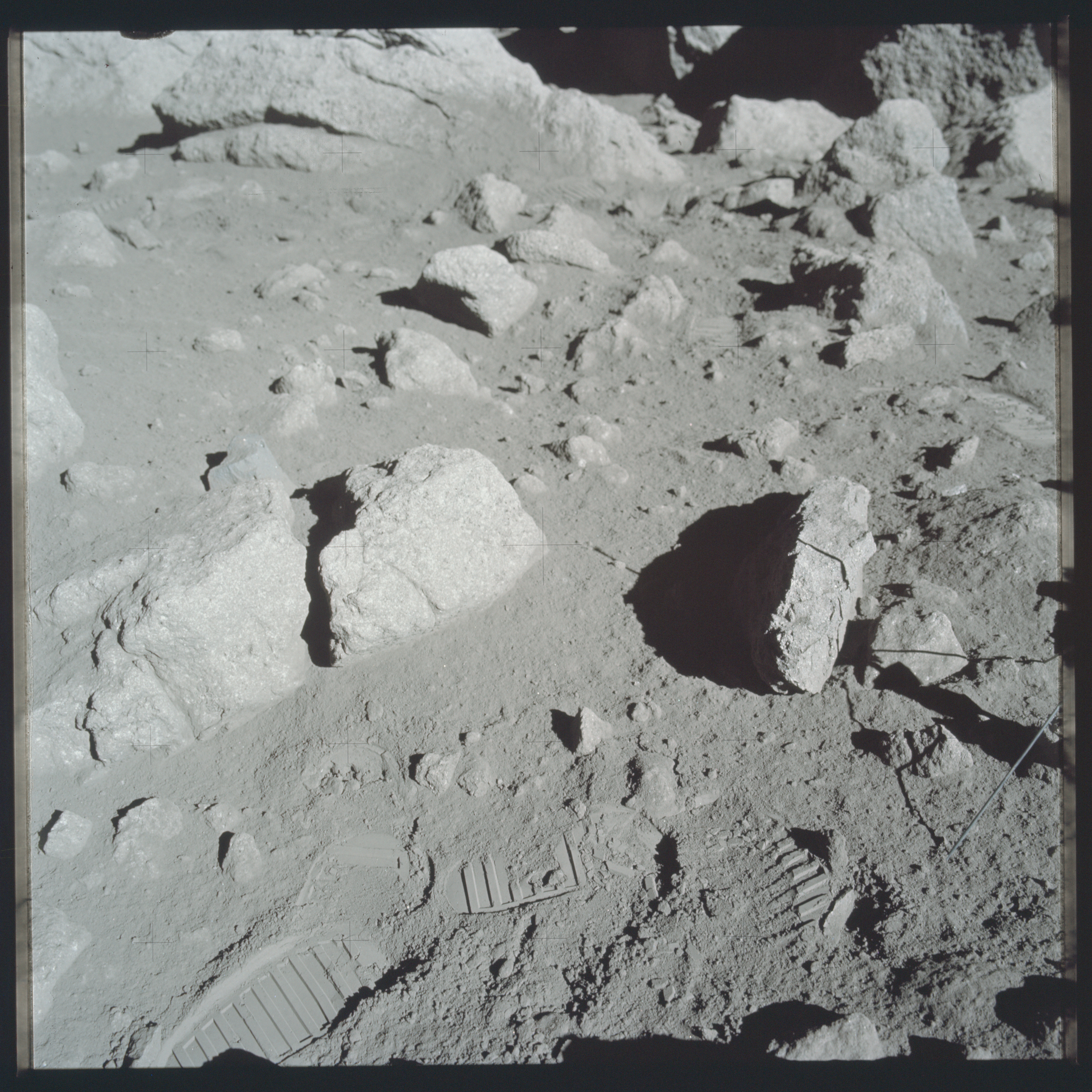
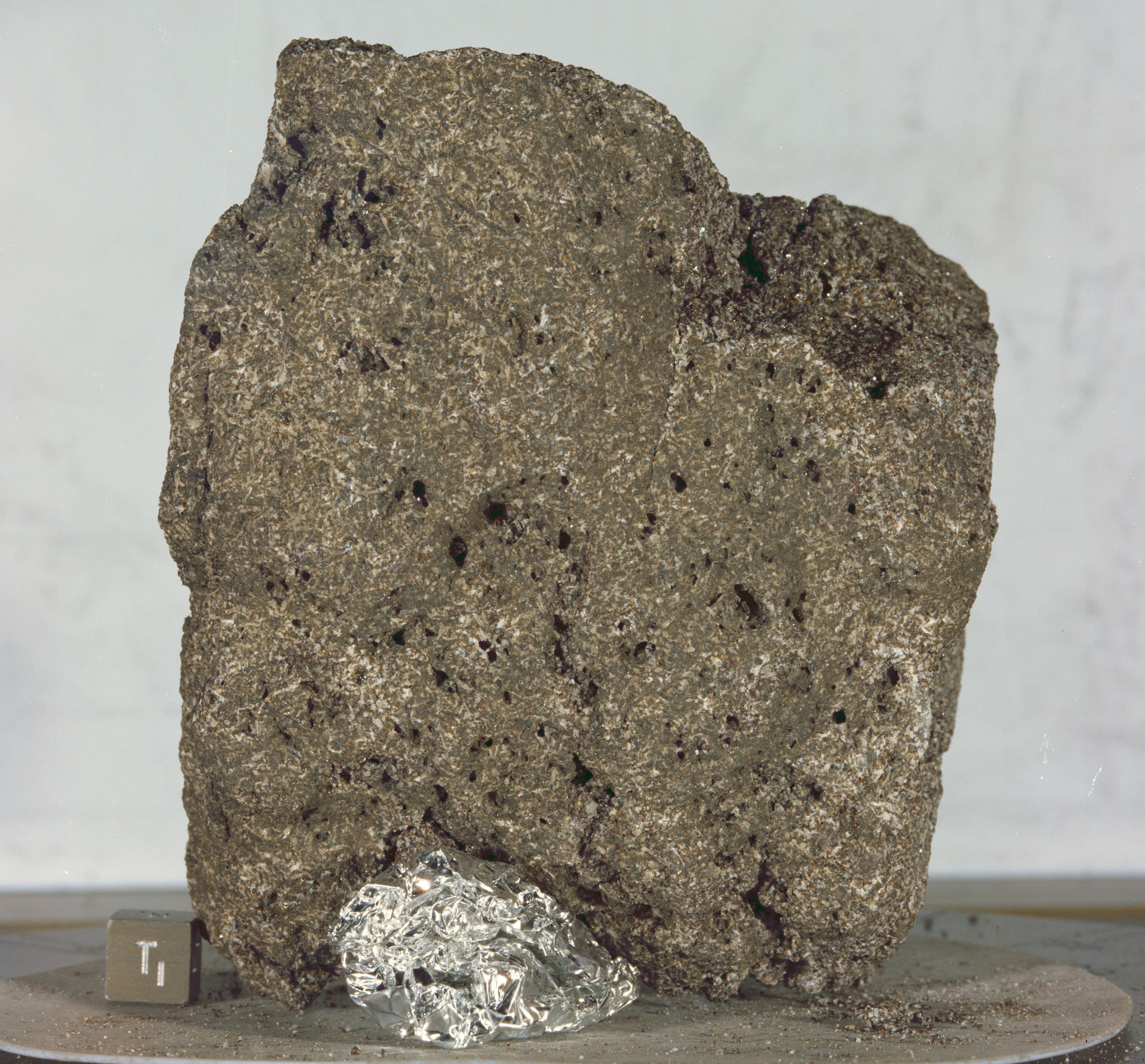
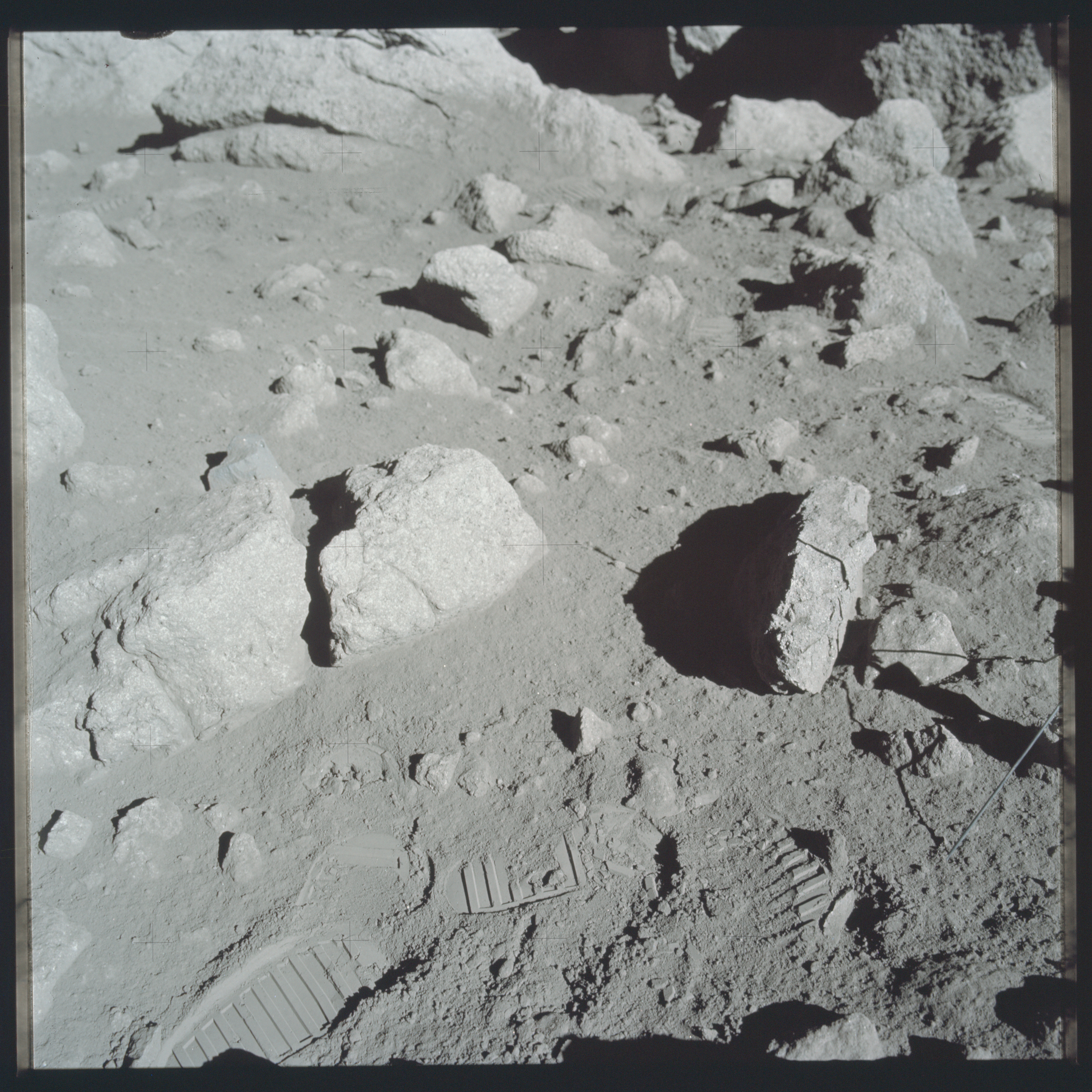
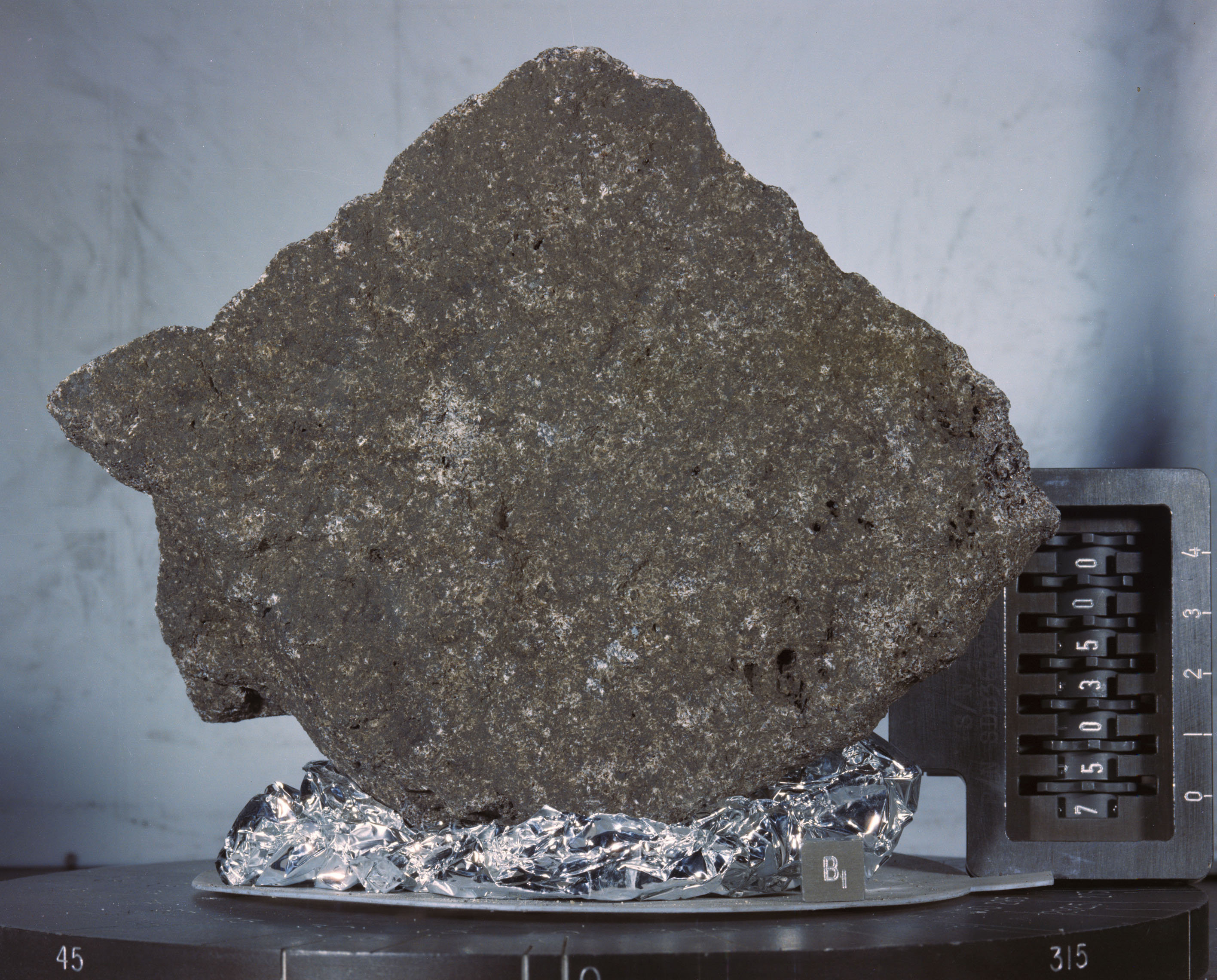
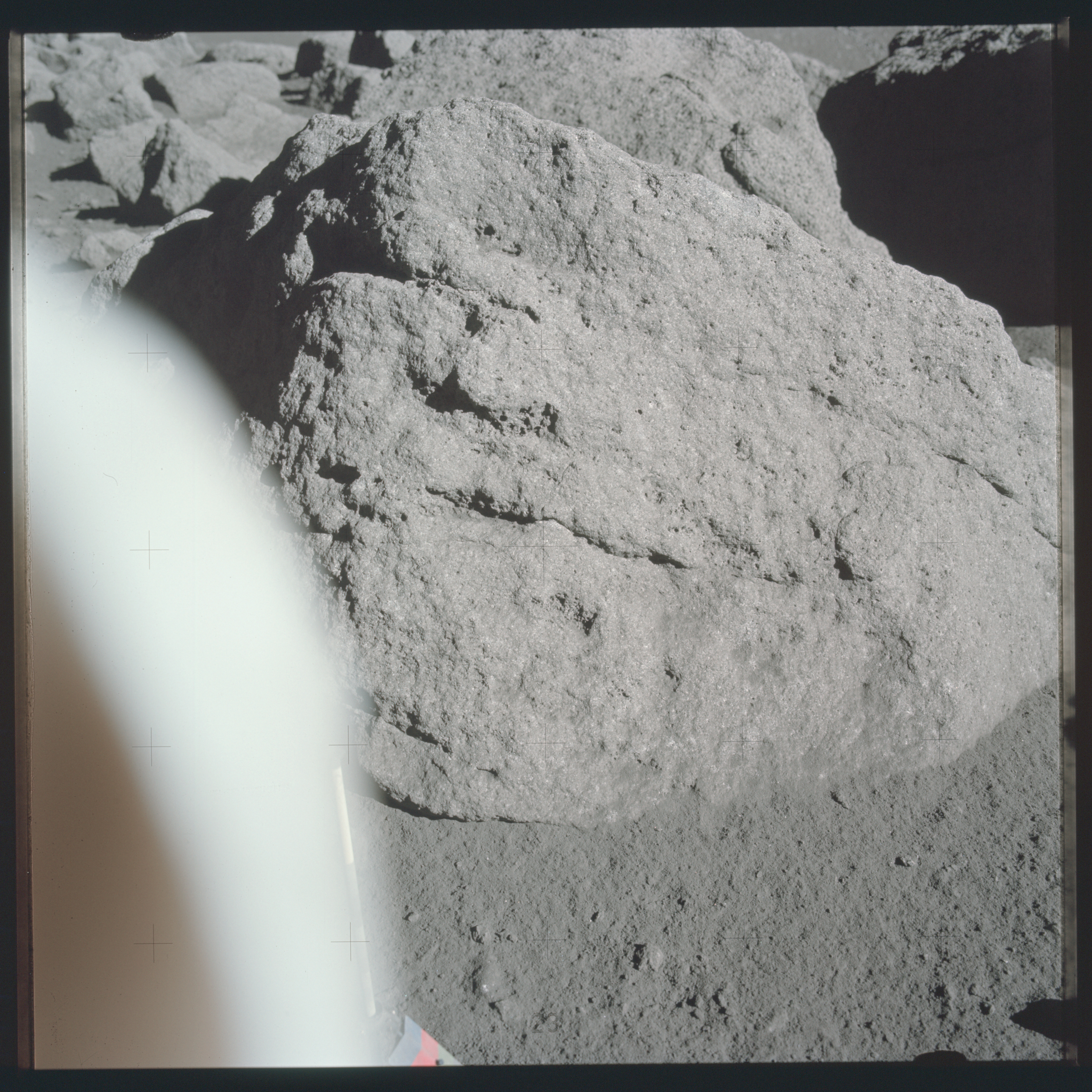
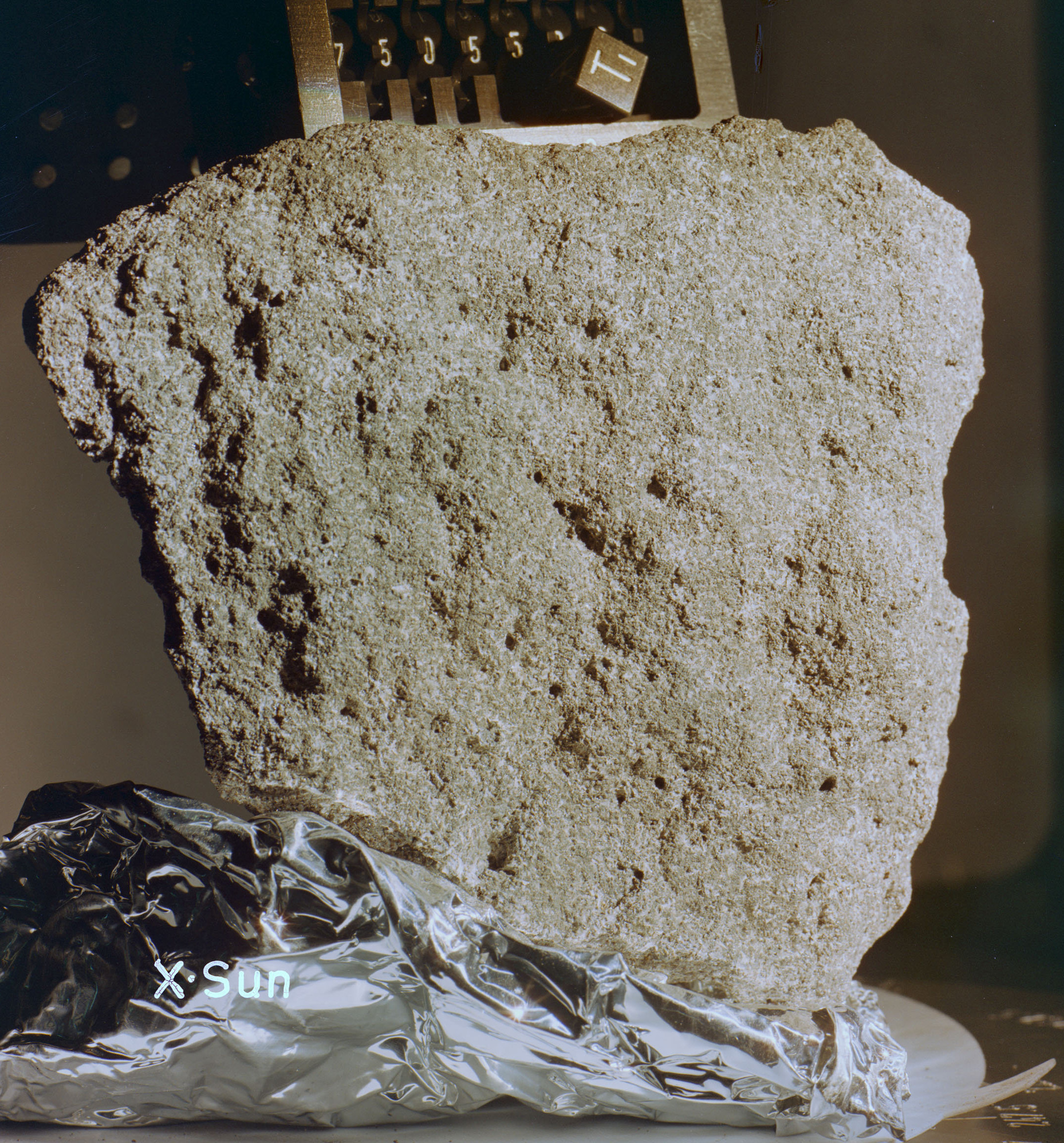
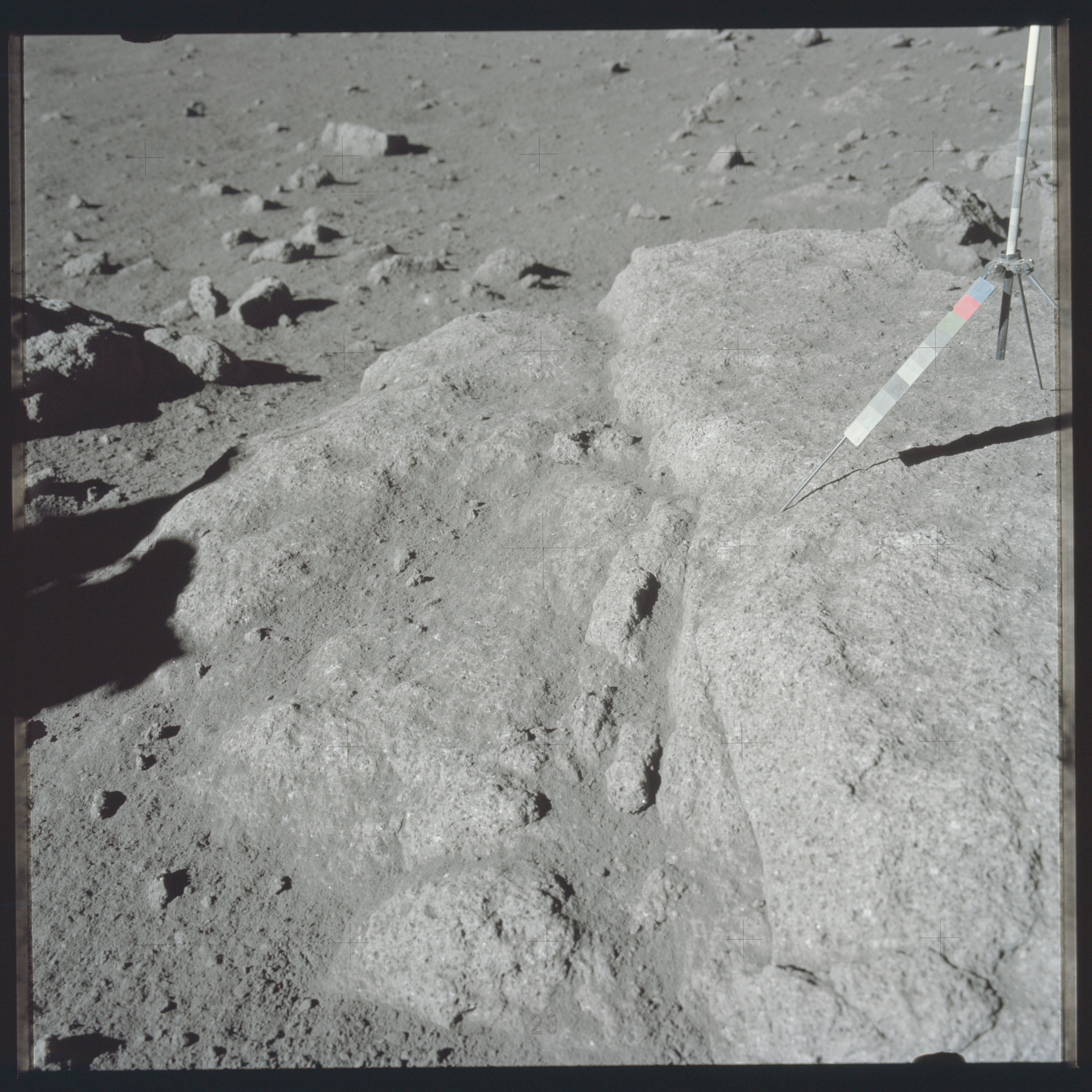
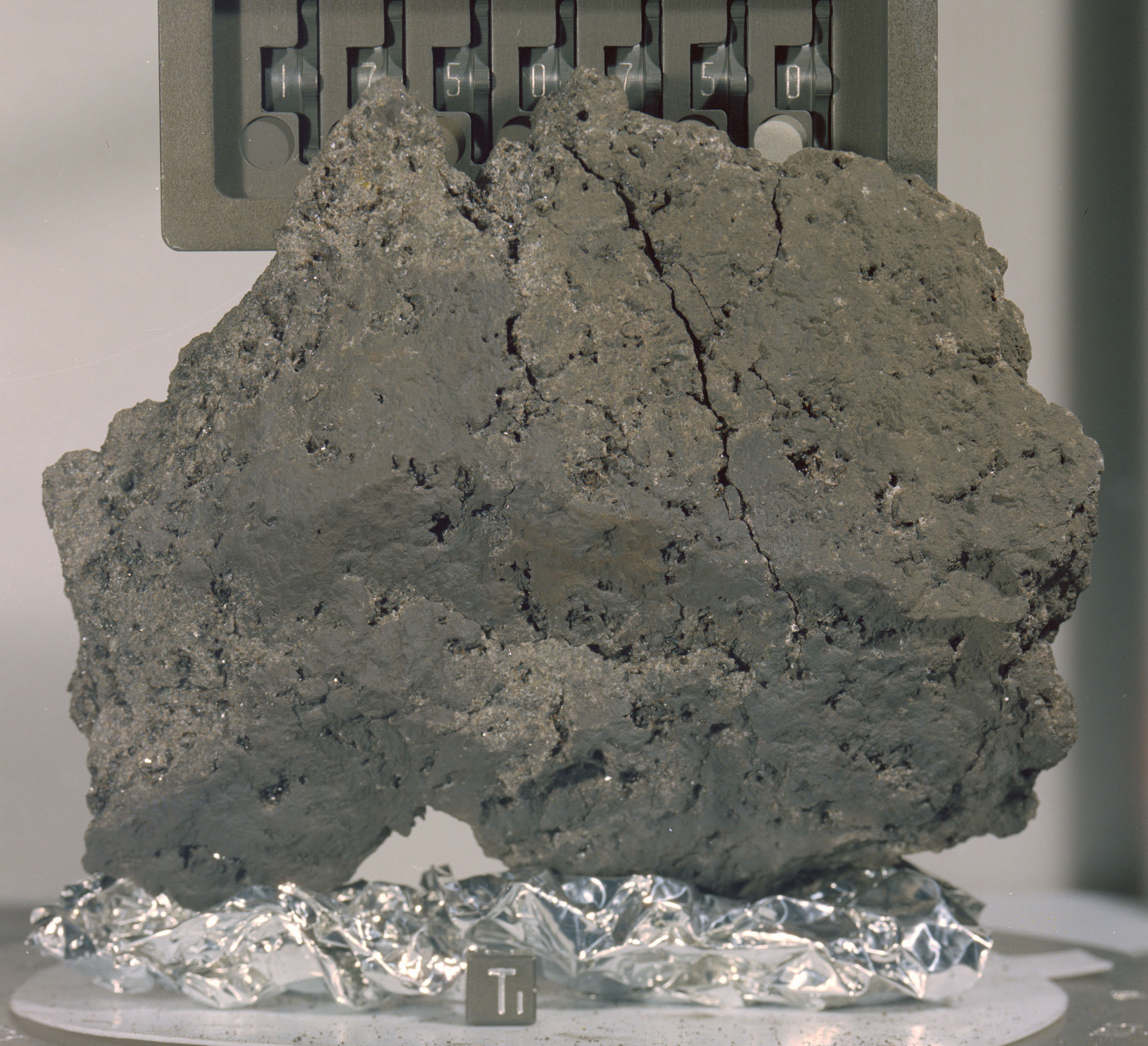
Sample	In Situ Photo	Rock Type	Lithology	Photo
75015		Coarse basalt	Ilmenite Basalt
75035		Medium basalt	Ilmenite Basalt
75055		Coarse basalt	Ilmenite Basalt
75065	-	Medium basalt	High-Ti Mare Basalt	-
75066	-	Dark-gray basalt	Glassy Breccia	-
75075		Medium basalt	Vuggy Ilmenite Basalt
75085	-	Medium basalt	High-Ti Basalt (from soil sample 75080)	-
75086	-	Medium basalt	High-Ti Basalt (from soil sample 75080)	-
75087	-	Medium basalt	High-Ti Basalt (from soil sample 75080)	-
75088	-	Fine basalt	High-Ti Basalt (from soil sample 75080)	-
75089	-	Fine basalt	High-Ti Basalt (from soil sample 75080)	-
75115	-	Fine basalt	High-Ti Basalt	-
