= Taurus–Littrow =

Lunar valley

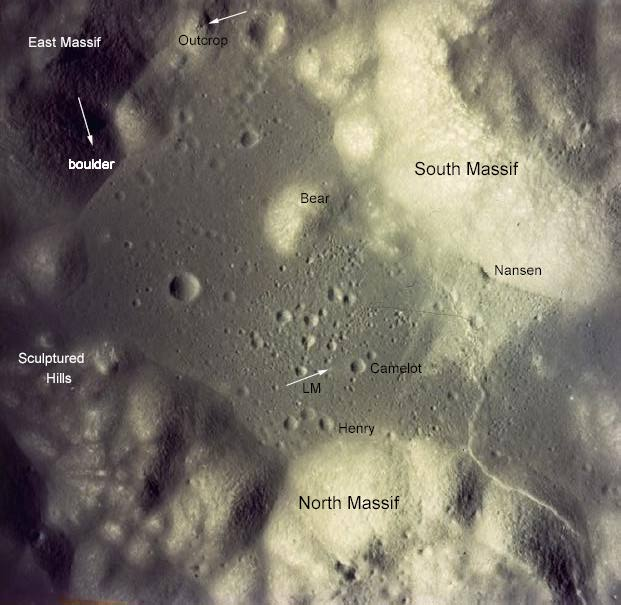
A labeled aerial photo of the Taurus–Littrow valley (north is at the bottom)

Taurus–Littrow is a lunar valley located on the near side at the coordinates 20.0°N 31.0°E. It served as the landing site for the American Apollo 17 mission in December 1972, the last crewed mission to the Moon. The valley is located on the southeastern edge of Mare Serenitatis along a ring of mountains formed between 3.8 and 3.9 billion years ago when a large object impacted the Moon, forming the Serenitatis basin and pushing rock outward and upward.

Taurus–Littrow is located in the Taurus mountain range and south of Littrow crater, features from which the valley received its name. The valley's name, coined by the Apollo 17 crew, was approved by the International Astronomical Union in 1973.

Data collected during Apollo 17 indicate that the valley is composed primarily of feldspar-rich breccia in the large massifs surrounding the valley and basalt underlying the valley floor, covered by an unconsolidated layer of mixed material formed by various geologic events. Taurus–Littrow was selected as the Apollo 17 landing site with the objectives of sampling highland material and young volcanic material at the same location.

== Geology ==
=== Formation and geography ===
Astronaut Harrison Schmitt working next to Tracy's Rock in the Taurus–Littrow valley on the Apollo 17 mission in 1972. The South massif is visible to the right.

Several million years after the formation of the Serenitatis basin, lavas began to upwell from the Moon's interior, filling the basin and forming what is now known as Mare Serenitatis. As a result of these lavas, rock and soil samples from the area that were collected by Apollo 17 astronauts Eugene Cernan and Harrison Schmitt provided insight into the natural history and geologic timeline of the Moon.

Somewhere between 100 and 200 million years after the Serenitatis basin and Taurus–Littrow formed, the lavas that had seeped through the lunar crust began to flood the low-lying areas. These lava flows were often accompanied by lava fountains that blanketed the surrounding area with tiny glass beads. These glass beads may present as a discoloration of the soil in which they came to rest, including that of the "orange soil" discovered by the Apollo 17 astronauts at Shorty crater. Most of these beads, however, are dark in coloration, to which the dark appearance of Mare Serenitatis from Earth can be attributed.

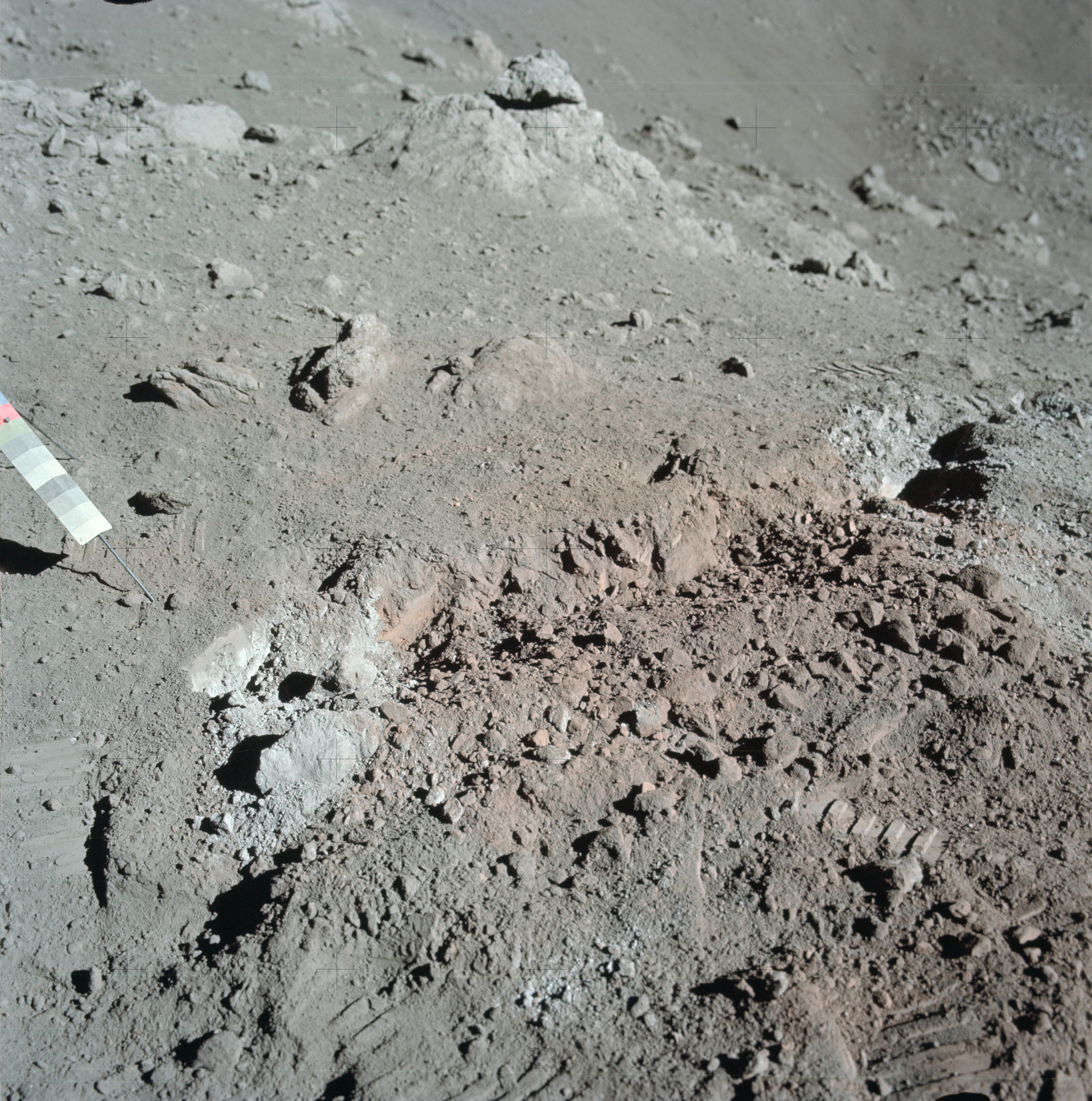
A close-up of the orange soil discovered on Apollo 17, the result of volcanic glass beads.

The valley is elongated along an axis that roughly intersects with center of Mare Serenitatis. Large massifs are located on either side of the valley, named the North and South massifs, respective to their geographic location in relation to each other. The height of these massifs give the valley a depth greater than that of the Grand Canyon in the United States.

Along the South Massif lies Bear Mountain, named after a mountain of the same name near Harrison Schmitt's hometown of Silver City, New Mexico. The sculptured hills and East massif make up the eastern edge of the valley and to the west, a scarp cuts across the valley floor and rises about two kilometres (1.2 miles) above it. The North and South massifs funnel into the main outlet of the valley, which in turn opens to Mare Serenitatis, such gap partially blocked by Family mountain.

Based on Apollo 17 observations, the valley floor is generally a gently rolling plain. Boulders of various sizes, together with other geologic deposits, are scattered throughout the valley. At the ALSEP lunar experiment deployment area, located west of the immediate landing site, the boulders average about four meters in size and are higher in concentration than in other areas of the valley.

The Tycho impact, which occurred between 15–20 and 70–95 million years ago, formed secondary crater clusters in various locations of the Moon. Data from the examination of these clusters suggest that the central crater cluster in the valley formed as a result of that impact. Analysis of known secondary impact clusters resulting from the Tycho impact reveals that the majority of them have a downrange ejecta blanket, or debris layer, with a distinctive 'birdsfoot' pattern. Apollo 17 observation data and comparison between the valley's central crater cluster and known Tycho secondary impacts indicate many similarities between them.

The valley's central crater cluster has a 'birdsfoot' ejecta pattern that points in the direction of Tycho and the debris pattern of the light mantle points directly towards the South massif. The latter lends further support to the hypothesis that the light mantle formed as a result of an avalanche from the South massif, perhaps as a result of secondary Tycho impacts. Large-scale analysis suggests that the crater cluster may be part of a larger secondary Tycho cluster, which may include craters on the North massif and other clusters as far north as Littrow crater. If indeed related, these smaller clusters could then form a large cluster, a constituent of a nearby ray of Tycho.

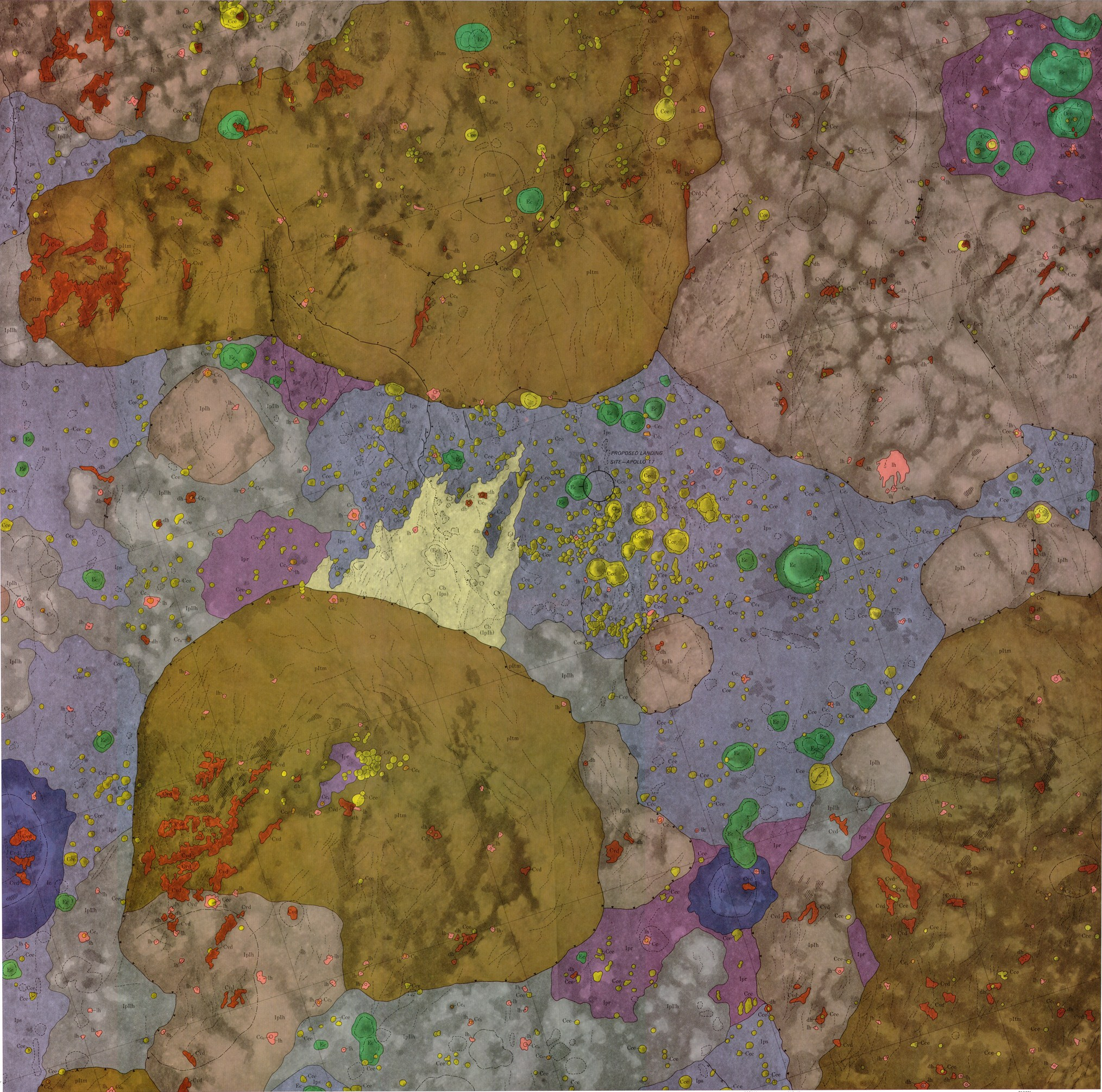
A geologic map of Taurus–Littrow. Legend: Very dark mantle material Light mantle material Dark mantle material Plains material Hills material Terra massif material Crater material Crater material

=== Composition ===
Evidence from the Apollo 17 mission indicates that the massifs surrounding the valley are composed primarily of feldspar-rich breccia and that basalt underlies the valley floor, a result of the lava flows during the valley's geologic history. Seismic studies suggest that the basalt below the valley floor is greater than 1,400 meters (4,600 feet) thick. Above the layer of subfloor basalt lies a deposit of unconsolidated material of various compositions ranging from volcanic material to impact-formed regolith.

The valley floor's unusually low albedo, or reflectivity, is a direct result of the volcanic material and glass beads located there. The deeper craters on the valley floor act as 'natural drill holes' and afforded Apollo 17 the ability to sample the subfloor basalt. These basalt samples are composed primarily of plagioclase, but also contain amounts of clinopyroxene and other minerals.

The unconsolidated regolith layer on the valley floor has a thickness of about 14 metres (46 ft) and contains ejecta from many impact event, most notably that which formed Tycho. Apollo 17 was thereby able to retrieve sample material from the Tycho impact without having to visit the crater itself. The possibility that select craters in the valley could be secondary impacts resulting from the Tycho impact presented further opportunity for sampling ejecta from that impact.

There are several geologic deposits on the valley floor originating from a variety of events in the geologic timeline of the Moon. One of these formations, the light mantle, is a deposit of lightly colored material in a series of projections extending about six kilometres (3.7 mi) from the south massif across the floor. Pre-Apollo 17 analyses suggested that this deposit might have been the result of an avalanche originating from the northern slope of the south massif.

Analysis of the mantle material collected during Apollo 17 revealed a finely-grained texture interspersed with larger fragments of rock. Evidence from these samples, together with visual observation during Apollo 17, indicate that the light mantle varies in thickness throughout the valley. Craters located farther away from the south massif penetrate through the light mantle to darker underlying material. Meanwhile, craters close to the south massif as wide as 75 metres (246 ft) do not appear to penetrate to darker material at all. The age of the light mantle is estimated to be about the same as the valley's central crater cluster, or about 70–95 million years old.

Apollo 17 discovered and returned Troctolite 76535, a 4.25 billion-year-old coarse-grained troctolite composed primarily of olivine and plagioclase, in the valley as part of a rake sample. The sample has been called the most interesting to be returned from the Moon and has been the subject of thermochronological calculation in an effort to determine whether the Moon generated a core dynamo or formed a metallic core, an inquiry that has yielded results in apparent support of the former—an active, churning core which generated a magnetic field, manifested in the magnetism of the sample itself. Further analysis by Garrick-Bethell et al. of the sample reveals nearly unidirectional magnetism—perhaps parallel to that of a larger field—lending further support to the hypothesis that the sample's magnetic properties are the result of a core dynamo in lieu of a singular shock event acting upon it.

Rocks sampled in the immediate vicinity of the Lunar Module are mostly vesicular coarse-grained subfloor basalt, with some appearance of fine-grained basalt as well. Much of the valley floor, as indicated by observations of the immediate landing area, is made up of regolith and fragments varying in sizes excavated by several impacts in the Moon's history.

Mineral compositions of Apollo 17 basalts
Mineral	Microscopic volume %	Megascopic volume %
Plagioclase	22–45	20–50
Clinopyroxene	31–51	30–70
Olivine	0–7	0–10
Ilmenite/opaques	13–26	5–25
Cristobalite	0–6	–
Spinel	Trace	–
Glass	Trace	–

== Landing site selection ==
As Apollo 17 was the final lunar mission of the Apollo program, planners identified a number of different scientific objectives in order to maximize the expedition's scientific productivity. Landing sites considered and rejected for previous missions received reconsideration. Taurus–Littrow was one of several potential landing sites considered for Apollo 17 along with Tycho crater, Copernicus crater, and Tsiolkovskiy crater on the far side, among others.

Planners ultimately eliminated all but Taurus–Littrow from consideration for a combination of operational and scientific justifications. A landing at Tycho was thought to exceed mission safety constraints because of the rough terrain found there. A landing on the far side in Tsiolkovskiy would add the expense and logistical difficulty of communications satellites that would be necessary to maintain contact between the crew and mission control during surface operations, and data from Apollo 12 had already afforded an opportunity to gauge the timing and history of the Copernicus impact.

Apollo mission planners ultimately selected Taurus–Littrow with the dual objectives of sampling ancient highland material and young volcanic material at the same landing site—the former in the form of Tycho ejecta, and the latter as a result the supposed volcanic origin of some of the valley floor's crater-like features.

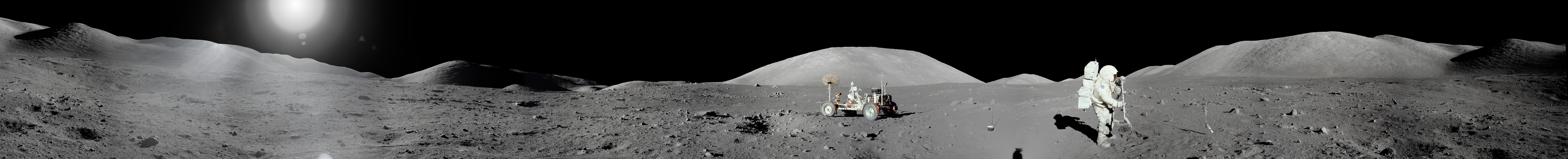
A panorama of the Taurus–Littrow valley taken on the Apollo 17 mission.

=== Future exploration ===
The Apollo 17 landing site within the valley is subject to NASA's guidelines for the protection of Apollo lunar landing sites issued in 2011, which recommend keeping new exploration away from the vicinity of the aging Apollo 17 hardware that NASA has identified as historically significant. Aerospace company PTScientists announced in 2019 that its ALINA lunar lander was planned to land 3 to 5 km (1.9 to 3.1 mi) away from the Apollo 17 LM within the Taurus–Littrow valley in early 2020, later postponed to an indefinite date no earlier the second half of 2021.

== Craters within Taurus–Littrow ==
Feature name	Diameter (km)	Namesake
Bowen-Apollo	0.30	Geologist Norman L. Bowen
Brontë	0.21	Author Charlotte Brontë
Camelot	0.61	Camelot of Arthurian legend
Cochise	0.56	Cochise, Chief of the Chiricahua Apache
Emory	0.55	Explorer and surveyor William H. Emory
Henry	0.30	Prince Henry the Navigator
Hess-Apollo	0.38	Geologist Harry Hammond Hess
Horatio	0.38	Fictional character Horatio Hornblower
Lara	0.62	Larissa from the novel Doctor Zhivago
Mackin	0.48	Geologist Joseph Hoover Mackin
Nansen-Apollo	0.86	Explorer Fridtjof Nansen
Powell	0.40	Geologist and explorer John Wesley Powell
Shakespeare	0.54	Playwright William Shakespeare
Sherlock	0.52	Fictional character Sherlock Holmes
Shorty	0.11	Fictional character from Trout Fishing in America
Steno-Apollo	0.52	Scientist Nicolas Steno
Trident (crater)	0.56	Trident, a three-pronged spear
Van Serg	0.10	Alias of geologist Hugh McKinstry
Victory	0.51	"Victory" speech of Winston Churchill

== See also ==
- Apollo 17
- Geology of the Moon
- Mare Serenitatis
