= Troctolite 76535 =

Lunar rock sample

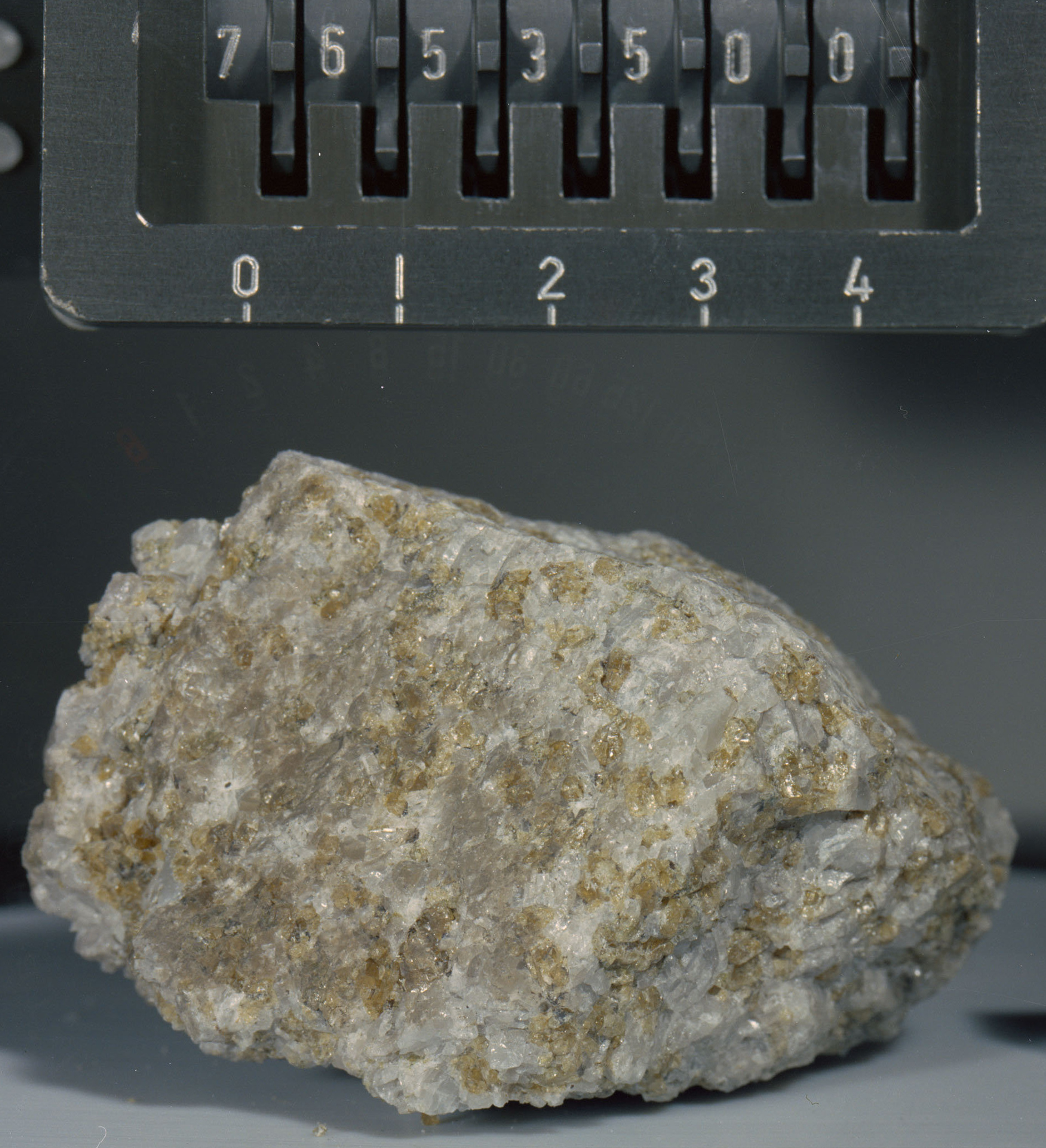
NASA image of Troctolite 76535.

Troctolite 76535 is a lunar sample discovered and collected on the Apollo 17 mission in 1972 in the Taurus–Littrow valley. It has a mass of about 156 grams (5.5 oz) and is about 5 centimeters (2.0 in) across at its widest point. It was collected by geologist astronaut Harrison Schmitt as part of a "rake sample" of lunar soil at Geology Station 6, near the base of the North Massif. Troctolite 76535 has been called the most interesting sample returned from the Moon.

== Description ==
Troctolite 76535 is a coarse-grained plutonic rock that is believed to have had a slow cooling history. The rock originates from early in the Moon's history. Geologists have described it as a coarse-grained olivine-plagioclase cumulate with a granular polygonal texture. Olivine and plagioclase are of about equal quantities within 76535, while the remaining approximately 4% is made up of primarily orthopyroxene. According to early studies, the sample cooled at a depth of about 10–20 kilometers (6.2–12.4 mi), as well as its reequilibration and annealing. Later work indicated that the rock formed at a depth of 47 kilometers, about the middle to lower crust of the Moon, Investigations have shown that the rock may have formed as a cumulate at depth, thus possibly making the sample an important link in the understanding of the geologic timeline of the Moon.

As Troctolite 76535 is the oldest known "unshocked" (meaning unaltered by meteor impacts) lunar rock, it has been used for thermochronological calculations in order to determine whether the Moon formed a metallic core or generated a core dynamo. The results of these studies have been shown to support the core dynamo hypothesis.

== See also ==
- List of individual rocks
