= Tracy's Rock =

Boulder on the Moon

Astronaut Harrison Schmitt working next to Tracy's Rock in the Taurus–Littrow valley on the Apollo 17 mission in 1972. The South massif is visible to the right.

Tracy's Rock, known as Split Rock or the Station 6 Boulder in the scientific literature, is a large boulder on the Moon which was visited by the Apollo 17 crew on December 13, 1972, at their Taurus-Littrow landing site. "Tracy's Rock" is its popular name.

Geologically it is impact melt breccia, having broken off from the North Massif.

== Examination ==
Geologist-astronaut Harrison Schmitt and mission commander Gene Cernan spent considerable time studying the rock and its vicinity at station 6 during their third Extravehicular Activity (EVA-3).

"Gene stepped to the northeast corner of fragment 1, put his left hand on the dust-covered shelf to support himself, and reached out as far as possible toward the center of the dusted area and swept the bag twice from his right to his left, leaving furrows and, at the lefthand end of each furrow, a small mound of dust where he stopped... A labeled detail from frame AS17-140-21496 shows the sample location, the area on the shelf probably disturbed by his left hand, and the area on the ground between fragment 1 and the foreground rock that he disturbed while taking the sample and earlier, at about 165:25:48, in the flightline."

At about 165:33:38, Cernan took a series of photos from higher up the hill. In this photomontage, Schmitt is standing to the left of the rock and the Lunar Roving Vehicle (LRV) is parked to the right.

"Cernan - 'I haven't seen the rock from this perspective in nearly nineteen years. My hand print really shows you how big the rock is and, in 21482, you can see across to the South Massif and the Scarp. The Scarp looks small in this photo, but I remember how big it was (80 meters) because we went up it.'"

The Tracy's Rock/Station 6 panorama is also featured in David Harland's "Geology 101 Field Trip" on the Apollo Lunar Surface Journal's "Fun Images" page.

== Naming ==
The patch of dirt on the north face of the boulder is the subject of a 1984 painting by Apollo 12 astronaut Alan Bean. Bean took up a career as a professional artist after he left the Astronaut Corps and developed a considerable reputation as a space artist.

As a result of the painting, those who know the story call the Station 6 boulder "Tracy's Rock". Tracy is Gene Cernan's daughter, who was nine years old at the time of the mission.

"Cernan - 'It was on this part of the rock that Al Bean wrote "Tracy", my daughter's name, in one of his paintings. After we came home I started to see a picture of the boulder in lots of places. It was the picture of Jack going past the corner of the rock (21496), one of the pictures from my pan. It became very popular. One day Al Bean came by and said he was doing a painting of it. And it was a big painting, six feet by three feet or something like that.

"Al likes to have stories in his paintings and he wanted to talk about it. So we talked about the slope and how hard it was to climb up there and I said that, if I'd known the picture was going to get so much notoriety, I wished I would have done something that I hadn't even thought of at the time. And that is to have printed Tracy's name in the dust.

"Al's daughter Amy and Tracy had grown up together and he asked 'How would you have done it'. So I wrote it out on a piece of paper and, some time later, he called and wanted me to come over and look at what he'd done. He had erased the place where I'd taken the sample and had put in Tracy's name, instead.

"And in the little story he put with the picture, he said that he'd done it to save me the trouble of going back to do it myself, and to save the taxpayers the expense of sending me back."

== See also ==
- List of individual rocks
