= Windimurra intrusion =

Geological feature in Western Australia

The Windimurra Igneous Complex is a giant ultramafic-mafic intrusion emplaced within the Yilgarn craton of Western Australia. It is located approximately 100 kilometres south east of the town of Mount Magnet.

== Setting ==
The Windimurra Igneous Complex is part of the c. 2813 Ma Meeline Suite of mafic-ultramafic layered intrusions of the central Murchison Domain, Yilgarn Craton of Western Australia. It is a conical body, approximately 7 km thick, primarily composed of layered gabbroic rocks, which intrude into c. 2820 Ma Norie Group rocks of the Murchison Supergroup. The intrusion is approximately 85 x 37 km (2500 km^{2}) in extent.

== Lithology ==
Windimurra contains in excess of 13,000m of intact igneous stratigraphy formed of cumulate layering by a process of fractional crystallization. Individual rock types can be grouped into a troctolite phase or series, a gabbro phase or series and a gabbronorite phase or series. Anorthosite cumulates are preserved in the roof sections, most of which are sheared and faulted off. A marginal granophyre complex exists in the roof and wall rocks, formed by advective heat transfer causing melting of the country rocks.

== Economic geology ==
The Windimurra Intrusion has been of great interest to mineral exploration companies for decades, as it is one of the thickest and largest ultramafic intrusions in the world, though it has been fragmented and mostly removed by shearing unlike the Bushveld Igneous Complex of South Africa.

Exploration has focused on finding basal nickel sulfide and chromitite deposits, although that has proved fruitless as the lower zone is not exposed. However, exploration for vanadium deposits related to oxide cumulate layers higher up in the intrusion has proved successful, with a positive bankable fesability study completed in 1998 followed by the construction and opening of a major vanadium operation in 1999.

=== Vanadium ===
The Shepherd's Discordant Zone is host to a laterally extensive vanadiferous magnetite and ilmenite adcumulate and mesocumulate deposit, forming a resource in excess of 120 Mt grading 5% V_{2}O_{5}. The vanadium mineralisation is approximately 500 m thick and contains a basal 2m thick magnetite zone (containing >70% magnetite) and podiform, lenticular magnetite horizons above it, which is of principal economic interest.

In addition a few oxide-rich layers in the upper zone of the intrusion are ilmenite rich, although these appear not to be economic.

== Windimurra Vanadium Mine ==
The Windimurra Vanadium operation was initially formed as the Vanadium Australia Pty Ltd Joint Venture between PMA (49%) and Glencore (51%), with Glencore providing the offtake agreement and in turn support funding for the project. PMA being the original developer retained 49% ownership and was appointed as the projects manager to oversee the detailed design, construction and commissioning of the Vanadium Processing plant. Glencore transferred its interest in the project to Xstrata AG, and Glencore retained the rights to 100% of the product off take.

While PMA was the junior company, PMA had retained the technical expertise to progress the project, so remained the Managing partner of the joint venture.

After PMA attempted the first feasibility study in 1991, the project was not deemed economical at the time. Meanwhile its competing project in South Africa (Rhovan) was commissioned in 1991, as a magnetic concentrate producer. (Rhovan installed their kiln in 1994 and then in 1996 Glencore took over Rhovan, resulting in the technical team looking for a new project to develop)

The original Rhovan Technical team that built and managed Rhovan under the leadership of Tony Simpson, reviewed the Windimurra project in early 1997, and later that year commenced with PMA to deliver the Pre-Feasibility study on Windimurra.

In 1998 the Bankable feasibility study was completed.

At the time, the Mine was designed to produce 16 million pounds per annum of high Quality Vanadium Pentoxide Flake (V_{2}O_{5}). this was equivalent to approximately 10% of the world's vanadium production at the time (1999).

The first salable product was produced as V_{2}O_{5} Flake in January 2000. Then through suppressed vanadium market pricing the operation was making a loss, through which PMA could not maintain their ownership. This resulted in PMA's ownership diluting to net 15% royalty or a minimum of $500,000 per year which ever was the higher.

In 2003 and after prolonged low vanadium pricing Xstrata made the decision to place Windimurra into care and maintenance. This was followed by the controversial decision to permanently close the site remove the processing plant and commence site rehabilitation in 2004.

Since then, various attempts have been made to redevelop the Windimurra Vanadium mine, unfortunately these attempts were not fruitful. This can be explained through poorly conceived wholesale changes made to the processing plant, along with a misconception to focus the mine on the deeper fresh Magnetite zones which result in high strip ratios.

The deposit is a weathered and disseminated Magnetite orebody, with base of weathering down to approximately 40-45m below surface.

The economic key to Windimurra, is the ability to produce a low cost, reasonable quality Magnetite Concentrate to feed the site large Rotary Kiln.
