= Troctolite =

Igneous rock

- Igneous rock
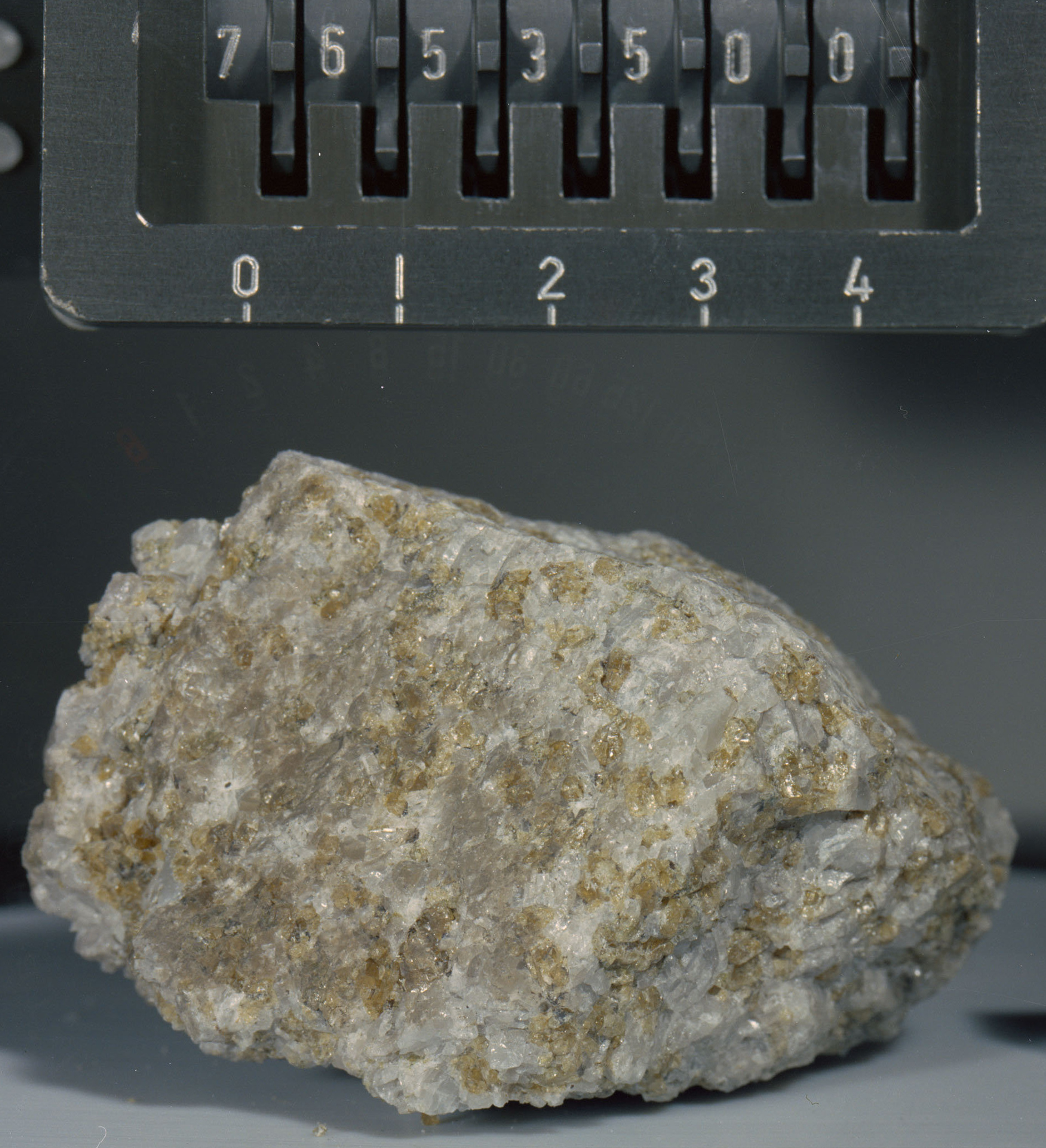
- Troctolite 76535 from the Apollo 17

Composition
- Classification: Mafic
- Primary: plagioclase, olivine
- Secondary: pyroxene
- Texture: Phaneritic

Troctolite /ˈtrɒktəlaɪt/ (from Greek τρώκτης 'trout' and λίθος 'stone') is a mafic intrusive rock type. It consists essentially of major but variable amounts of olivine and calcic plagioclase along with minor pyroxene. It is an olivine-rich anorthosite, or a pyroxene-depleted relative of gabbro. However, unlike gabbro, no troctolite corresponds in composition to a partial melt of peridotite. Thus, troctolite is necessarily a cumulate of crystals that have fractionated from melt.

Troctolite is found in some layered intrusions such as in the Archean Windimurra intrusion of Western Australia, the Voisey's Bay nickel-copper-cobalt magmatic sulfide deposit of northern Labrador, the Stillwater igneous complex of Montana, the Duluth Complex of the North American Midcontinent Rift, and the Tertiary Rhum layered intrusion of the island of Rùm, Scotland. Troctolite is also found, for example, in the Merensky Reef of the Bushveld Igneous Complex, South Africa and in the Lizard complex in Cornwall.
