= Horatio (crater) =

Crater on the Moon

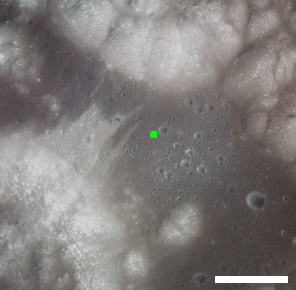
- Location of Horatio crater in Taurus-Littrow Valley. South Massif is at lower left, North Massif is at top center, and Sculptured Hills are at upper right. Scale bar is 5 km
- Coordinates: 20.19°N 30.71°E
- Diameter: 380 m
- Eponym: Astronaut-named feature

Horatio is a feature on Earth's Moon, a crater in Taurus-Littrow valley. Astronauts Eugene Cernan and Harrison Schmitt drove the Lunar Roving Vehicle along its south rim in 1972, on the Apollo 17 mission, but did not stop.

The larger Camelot crater is to the northeast. Geology Station 5 is along the south rim of Camelot. Victory is to the northwest, and Brontë is to the southwest.

The crater was named by the astronauts after the fictional Horatio Hornblower from the works of C. S. Forester.

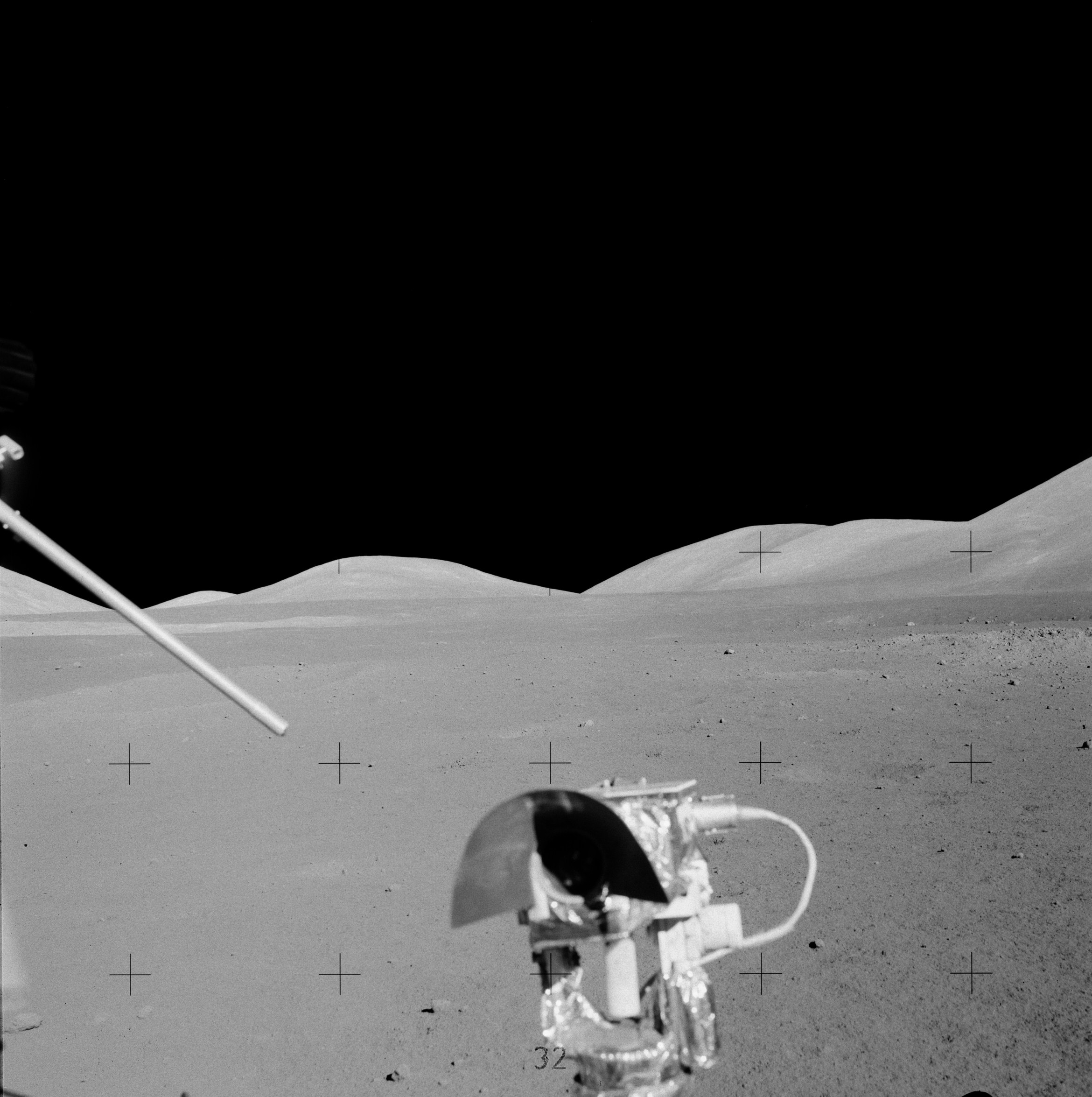
Photo taken from the rover while driving west from the landing site towards the South Massif, and part of Horatio is probably shown on the right

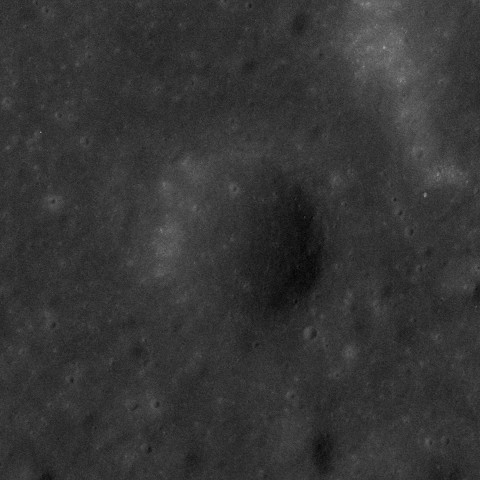
Apollo 17 panoramic camera image
