= Sherlock (crater) =

Crater on the Moon

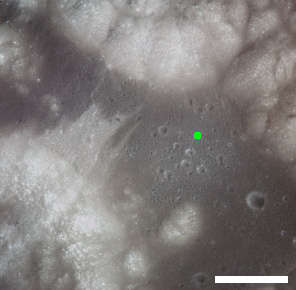
- Location of Sherlock crater in Taurus–Littrow valley. South Massif is at lower left, North Massif is at top center, and Sculptured Hills are at upper right. Scale bar is 5 km
- Coordinates: 20.15°N 30.79°E
- Diameter: 520 m
- Eponym: Astronaut-named feature

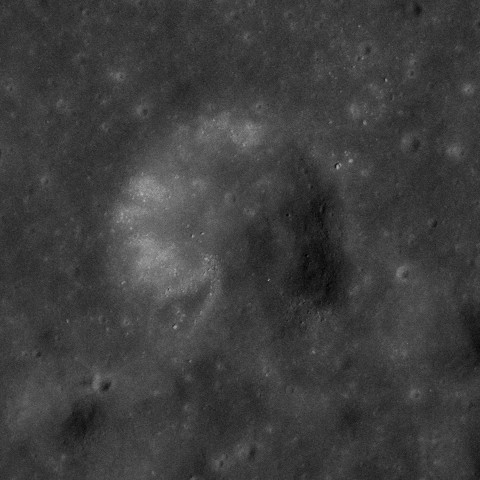
Apollo 17 panoramic camera image

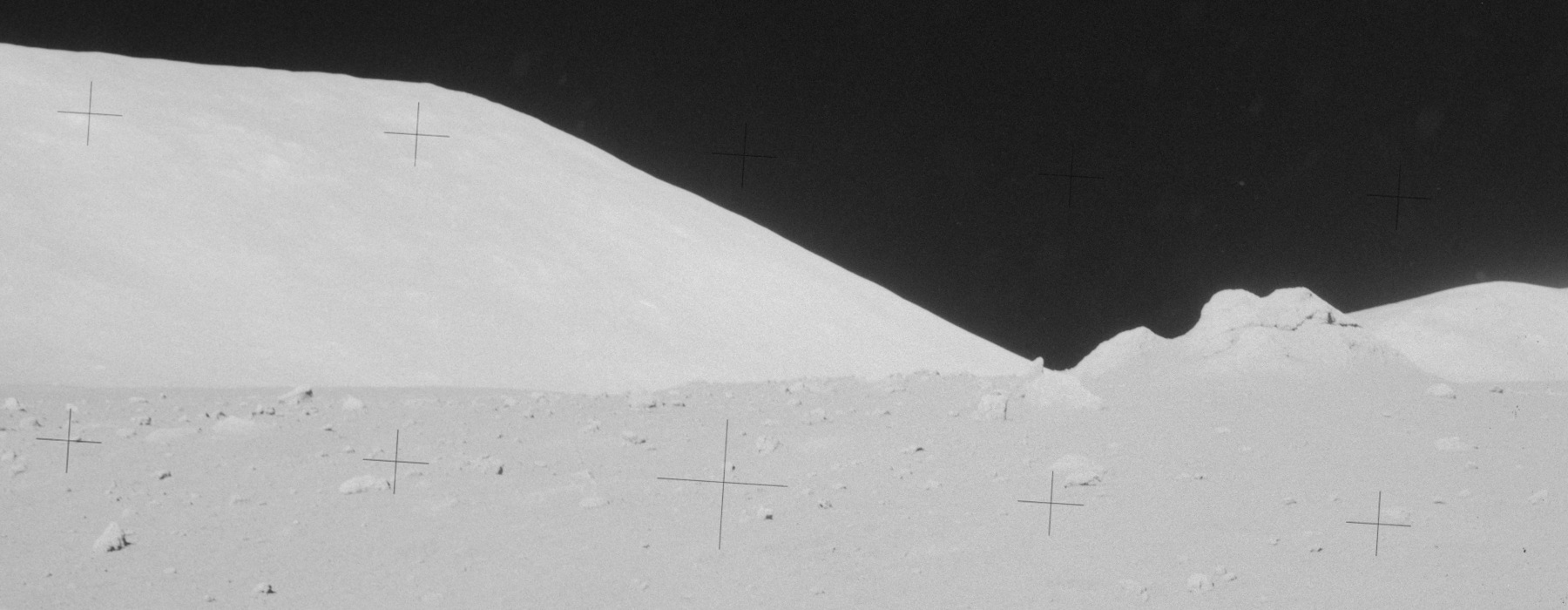
The Apollo 17 astronauts took this photo of the rim of Sherlock from their lunar rover on their way back to the lunar module from Van Serg crater.

Sherlock is a feature on Earth's Moon, a crater in Taurus–Littrow valley. Astronauts Eugene Cernan and Harrison Schmitt drove their rover to the north of it in 1972, on the Apollo 17 mission. They photographed the rim, as shown below.

Sherlock is about 1 km east of the Apollo 17 landing site. To the south of it is Steno crater and to the north are Van Serg and Shakespeare.

The crater was named by the astronauts after the fictional Sherlock Holmes from the works of Sir Arthur Conan Doyle.

Alternatively, the crater was named after Gerald Sherlock of Melbourne, Florida, who was good friends with astronaut Thomas P. Stafford. Gerald was a physicist. "Stafford told Sherlock he'd name something on the moon for him..."
