= Gene Cernan =

American astronaut and lunar explorer (1934–2017)

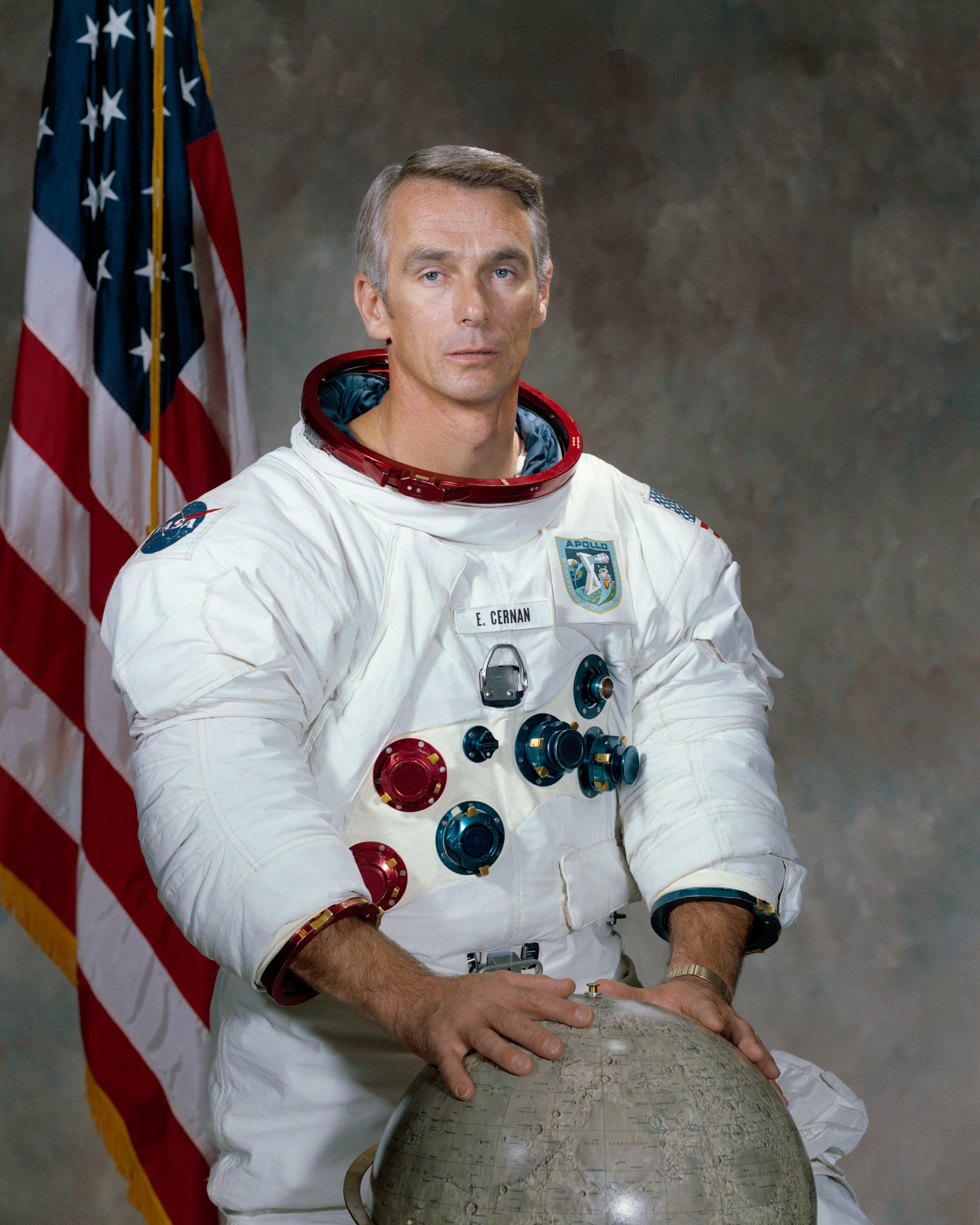
- Cernan in 1971
- Born: Eugene Andrew Cernan; March 14, 1934; Chicago, Illinois, U.S.
- Died: January 16, 2017 (aged 82); Houston, Texas, U.S.
- Resting place: Texas State Cemetery
- Education: Purdue University (BS); Naval Postgraduate School (MS)
- Spouse(s): Barbara Jean Artchley (m. 1961; div. 1981) Janis Ellen Jones (m. 1987)
- Children: 1
- Awards: Astronaut Badge (2); Distinguished Flying Cross; NASA Distinguished Service Medal
- Space career

NASA astronaut
- Rank: Captain, USN
- Time in space: 23d 14h 15m
- Selection: NASA Group 3 (1963)
- Total EVAs: 4
- Total EVA time: 24h 11m
- Mission: Gemini 9A; Apollo 10; Apollo 17
- Retired: July 1, 1976
- Website: Official website

Eugene Andrew Cernan (/ˈsɜːrnən/; March 14, 1934 – January 16, 2017) was an American astronaut, naval aviator, electrical engineer, aeronautical engineer, and fighter pilot. As of 2026, he is the last person to walk on the Moon.

Cernan traveled into space three times and to the Moon twice: as pilot of Gemini 9A in June 1966, as Lunar Module pilot of Apollo 10 in May 1969, and as commander of Apollo 17 in December 1972, the final Apollo lunar landing. He was also a backup crew member of Gemini 12, Apollo 7, and Apollo 14. During the Apollo 17 mission, he became the 11th person to walk on the Moon as well as the astronaut with the longest time spent walking on the Moon.

Before becoming an astronaut, Cernan graduated with a Bachelor of Science degree in electrical engineering from Purdue University in Indiana, and joined the U.S. Navy through the Naval Reserve Officers Training Corps (NROTC). After flight training, he received his naval aviator wings and served as a fighter pilot. In 1963, he received a Master of Science degree in aeronautical engineering from the U.S. Naval Postgraduate School. Achieving the rank of captain, he retired from the Navy in 1976.

== Biography ==
=== Early years ===
Cernan was born on March 14, 1934, in Chicago, Illinois; he was the son of Andrew George Cernan and Rose Cernan (née Cihlar). His father was of Slovak descent, and his mother was of Czech ancestry. He had one older sister, Dolores Ann. Cernan grew up in the Illinois towns of Bellwood and Maywood. He was a Boy Scout and earned the rank of Second Class. After attending McKinley Elementary School in Bellwood, and graduating from Proviso Township High School in Maywood in 1952, he studied at Purdue University and served as treasurer of the Phi Gamma Delta fraternity. He was also president of the Quarterdeck Society and the Scabbard and Blade, as well as a member of the Tau Beta Pi engineering honor society, the military ball committee and the Skull and Crescent leadership honor society. After his sophomore year, he accepted a partial Navy ROTC scholarship that required him to serve aboard USS Roanoke between his junior and senior years. In 1956, Cernan received a Bachelor of Science degree in electrical engineering; his final GPA was 5.1 out of 6.0.

=== Navy service ===
Cernan was commissioned an ensign in the U.S. Navy through the Naval Reserve Officers Training Corps (NROTC) at Purdue in 1956, and was initially stationed on the USS Saipan. Cernan changed to active duty and attended flight training at Whiting Field, Florida, Barron Field, Texas, NAS Corpus Christi, Texas, and NAS Memphis, Tennessee. Following flight training on the T-28 Trojan, T-33 Shooting Star, and F9F Panther, Cernan became a Naval Aviator, flying FJ-4 Fury and A-4 Skyhawk jets in Attack Squadrons 126 and 113. Upon completion of his assignment in NAS Miramar, California, he finished his education in 1963 at the U.S. Naval Postgraduate School with a Master of Science degree in aeronautical engineering.

During his naval career, Cernan logged more than 5,000 hours of flying time, including 4,800 hours in jet aircraft. Cernan also made at least 200 successful landings on aircraft carriers.

=== NASA career ===
In October 1963, NASA selected Cernan as one of the third group of astronauts to participate in the Gemini and Apollo space programs.

==== Gemini program ====
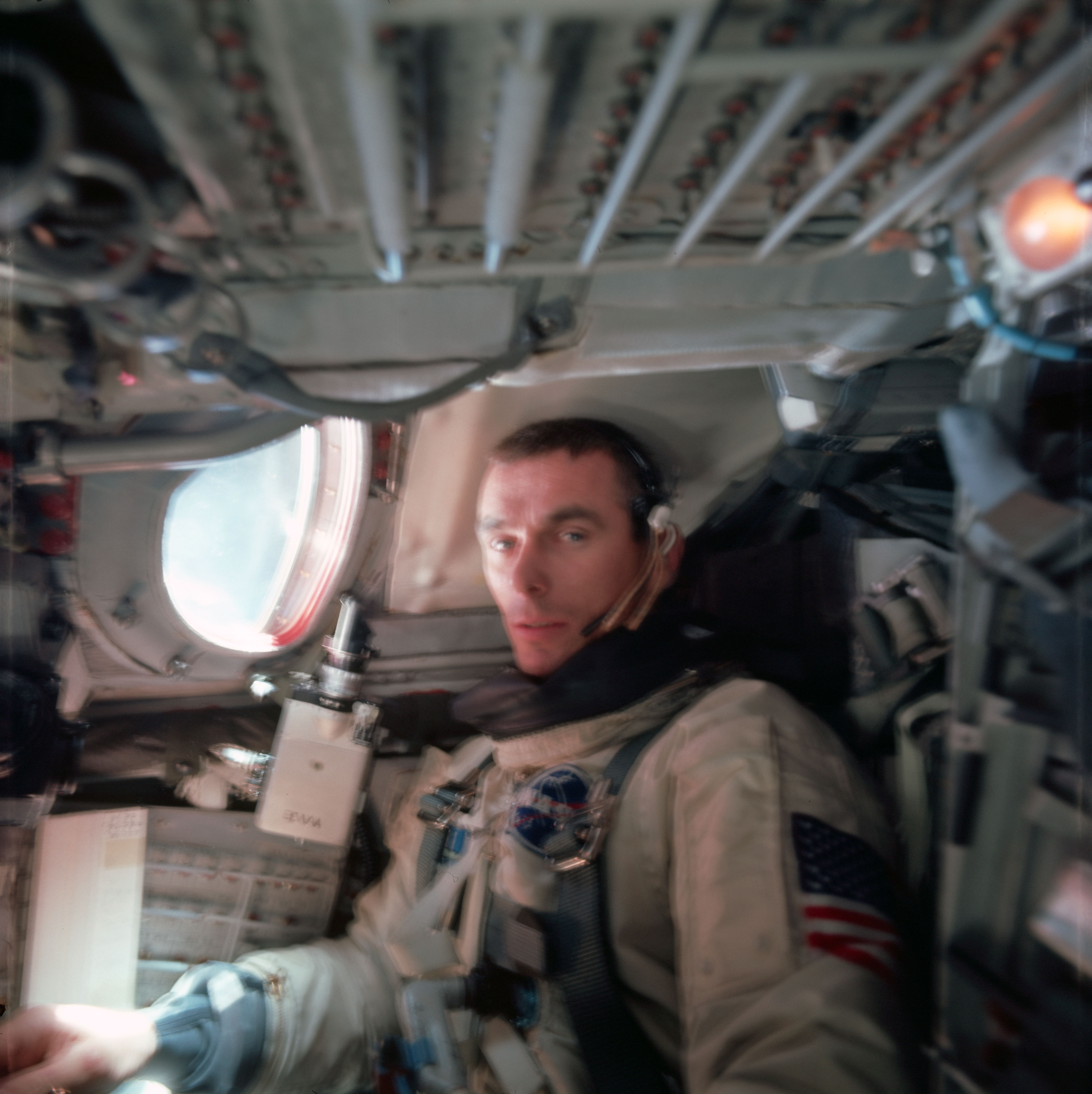
Cernan aboard Gemini 9A

Cernan was originally selected with Thomas Stafford as backup pilot for Gemini 9. When the prime crew of Elliot See and Charles Bassett was killed in the crash of NASA T-38A "901" (USAF serial 63–8181) at Lambert Field, Missouri, on February 28, 1966, the backup crew became the prime crew—the first time in NASA history this happened. Gemini 9A encountered a number of problems; the original target vehicle exploded during launch and the planned docking with a substitute target vehicle was made impossible by the failure of a protective shroud to separate after launch. The crew performed a rendezvous that simulated procedures that would be used in the Apollo 10 mission; the first optical rendezvous and a lunar-orbit-abort rendezvous. Cernan performed the second American EVA, the third-ever spacewalk, but overexertion caused by a lack of limb restraints prevented testing of the Astronaut Maneuvering Unit and forced the early termination of the spacewalk. Cernan was also a backup pilot for the Gemini 12 mission.

==== Apollo program ====
===== Apollo 10 =====
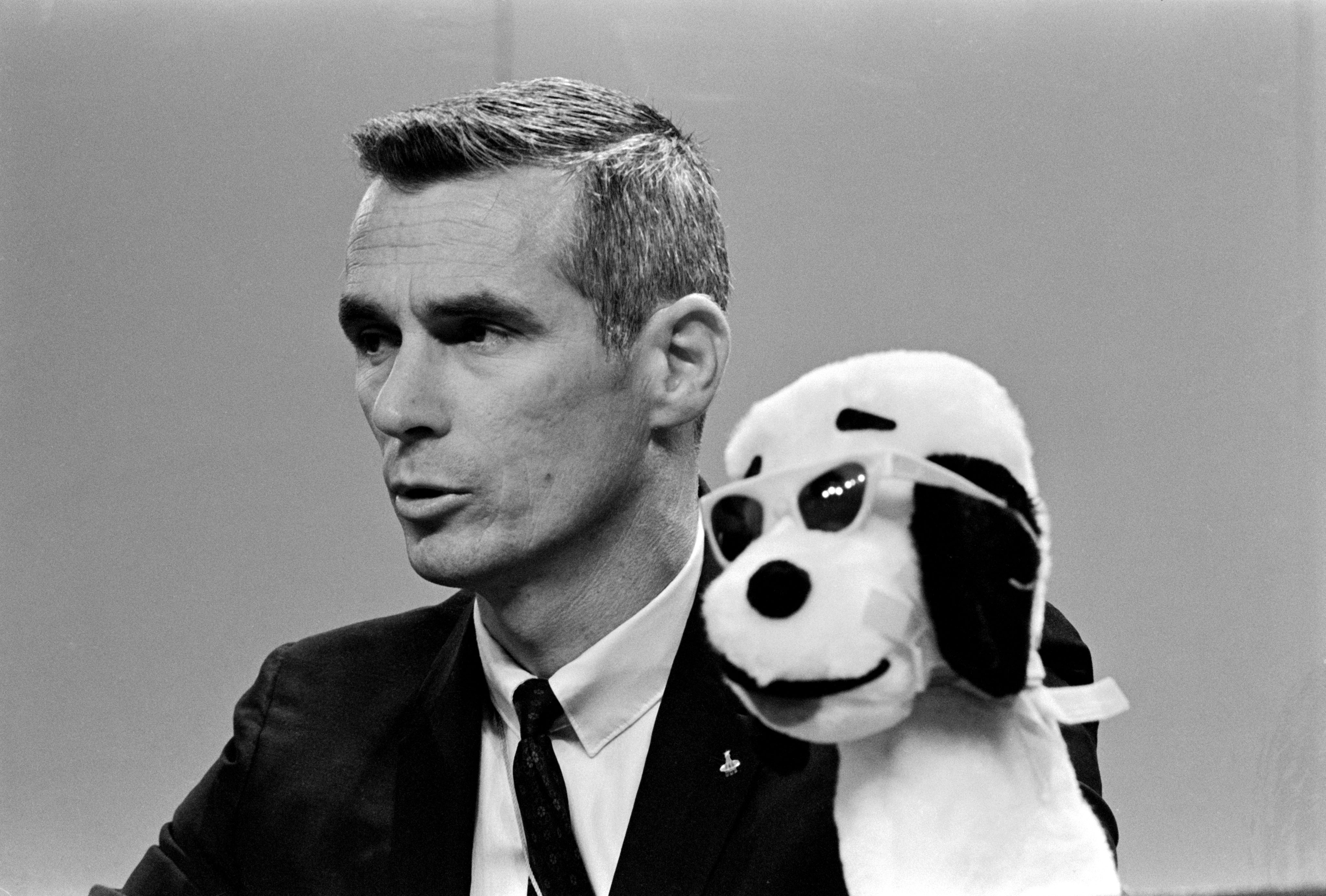
Cernan and Snoopy during Apollo 10 press conference

Cernan was selected as backup lunar module pilot for Apollo 7—although that flight carried no lunar module. Standard crew rotation put him in place as the Lunar Module Pilot on Apollo 10—the final dress rehearsal mission for the first Apollo lunar landing—on May 18–26, 1969.

During the Apollo 10 mission, Cernan and his commander, Tom Stafford, piloted the Lunar Module Snoopy in lunar orbit to within 8.5 nautical miles (15.7 km) of the lunar surface, and successfully executed every phase of a lunar landing up to final powered descent. This provided NASA planners with critical knowledge of technical systems and lunar gravitational conditions to enable Apollo 11 to land on the Moon two months later. Apollo 10 holds the record for the highest speed attained by any crewed vehicle at 39,897 km/h (24,791 mph)—more than 11 km/s (6.8 mi/s)—during its return from the Moon on May 26, 1969.

===== Apollo 17 =====
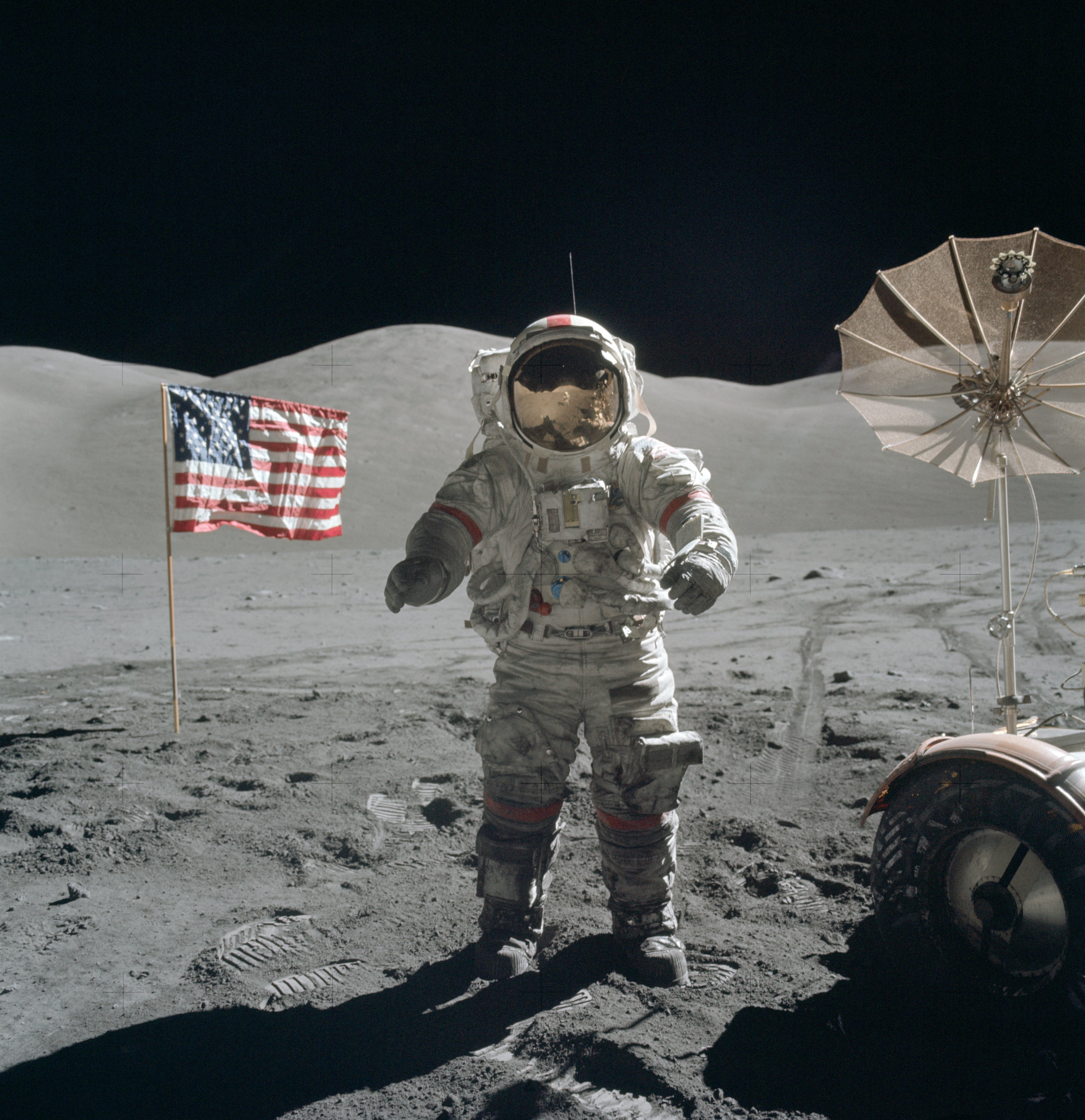
Cernan on the Moon during Apollo 17 (December 13, 1972)

Cernan declined the opportunity to walk on the Moon as Lunar Module Pilot of Apollo 16, preferring to risk missing a flight for the opportunity to command his own mission. Cernan moved back into the Apollo rotation as commander of the backup crew of Cernan, Ronald E. Evans, and Joe Engle for Apollo 14, putting him in position through normal crew rotation to command his own crew on Apollo 17. Escalating budget cutbacks for NASA brought the number of future missions into question. After the Apollo 18 and Apollo 19 missions were cancelled in September 1970, pressure from the scientific community mounted to shift Harrison Schmitt, the sole professional geologist in the active Apollo roster of astronauts, to the crew of Apollo 17, the final scheduled Apollo mission. In August 1971, NASA named Schmitt as the lunar module pilot for Apollo 17, which meant the original LM pilot Joe Engle lost his chance to walk on the Moon. Cernan fought to keep his crew together; given the choice of flying with Schmitt as LMP or seeing his entire crew removed from Apollo 17, Cernan chose to fly with Schmitt. Cernan eventually came to have a positive evaluation of Schmitt's abilities; he concluded that Schmitt was an outstanding LM pilot while Engle—notwithstanding his outstanding record as an aircraft test pilot—was merely an adequate one.

Cernan's role as commander of Apollo 17 closed out the Apollo program's lunar exploration mission with a number of record-setting achievements. During the three days of Apollo 17's surface activity (11–14 December 1972), Cernan and Schmitt performed three EVAs for a total of about 22 hours of exploration of the Taurus–Littrow valley. Their first EVA alone was more than three times the length astronauts Neil Armstrong and Buzz Aldrin spent outside the LM on Apollo 11. During this time, Cernan and Schmitt covered more than 35 km (22 mi; 19 nmi) using the Lunar Roving Vehicle and spent a great deal of time collecting geologic samples (including a record 110.4 kg (243 lb; 17.39 st) of samples, the most of any Apollo mission) that would shed light on the Moon's early history. Cernan piloted the rover on its final sortie, recording a maximum speed of 11.2 mph (18.0 km/h; 5.0 m/s), giving him the unofficial lunar land speed record.

As Cernan prepared to climb the ladder for the final time, he spoke these words, currently the last spoken by a human being standing on the lunar surface:

Bob, this is Gene, and I'm on the surface; and, as I take man's last step from the surface, back home for some time to come—but we believe not too long into the future—I'd like to just (say) what I believe history will record: that America's challenge of today has forged man's destiny of tomorrow. And, as we leave the Moon at Taurus–Littrow, we leave as we came and, God willing, as we shall return, with peace and hope for all mankind. Godspeed the crew of Apollo 17.

Cernan's status as the last person to walk on the Moon means Purdue University is the alma mater of both the first person to walk on the Moon (Neil Armstrong) and the most recent. Cernan is one of only three astronauts to travel to the Moon twice, along with Jim Lovell and John Young. He is also one of only twelve people to have walked on the Moon, as well as the only person to have flown in two different Apollo Lunar Modules in space while not docked to the Apollo Command and Service Module, both times near the Moon.

=== Post-NASA activities ===
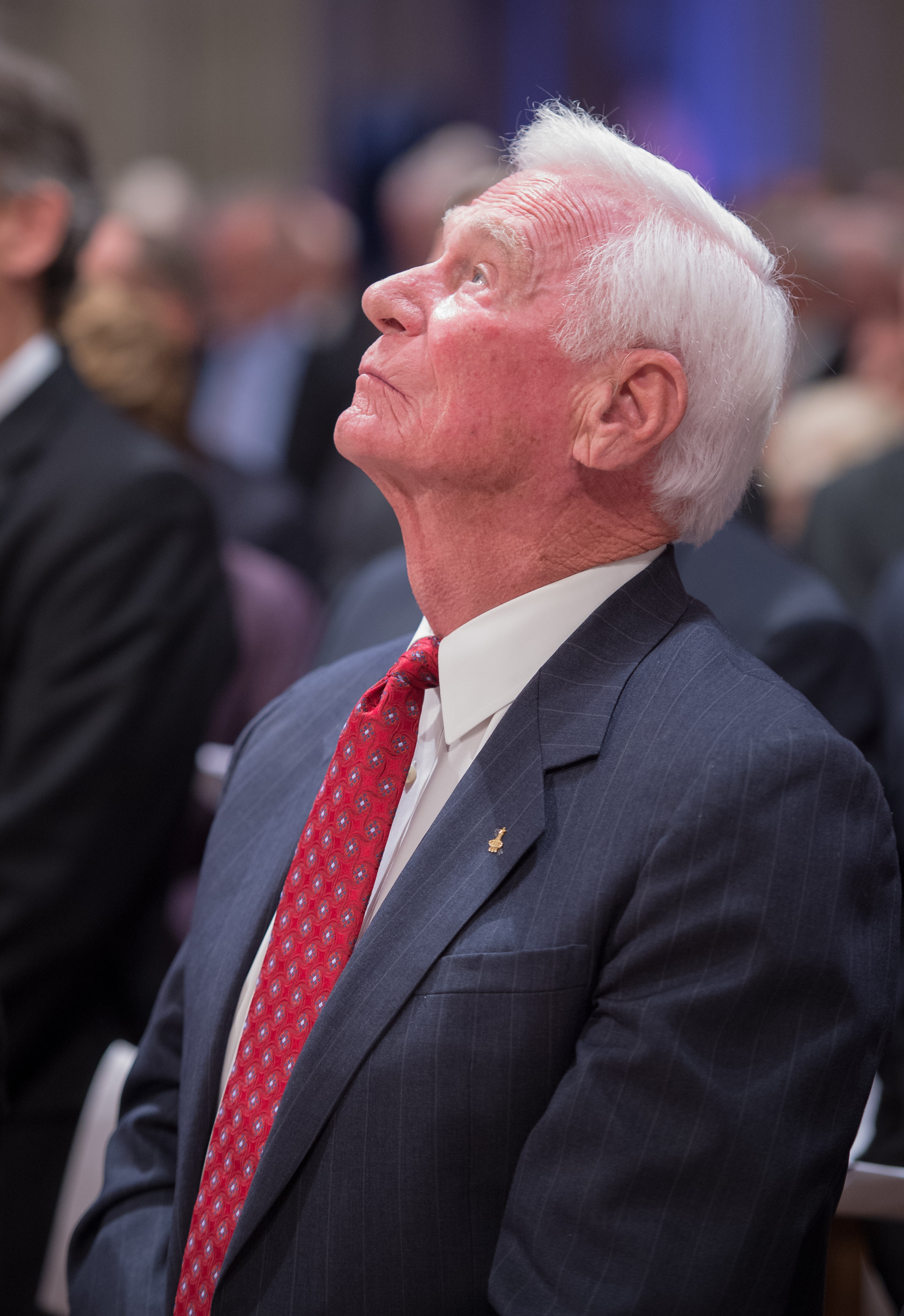
Eugene Cernan at a memorial service for Neil Armstrong September 13, 2012

In 1976, Cernan retired from the Navy with the rank of captain and went from NASA into private business, becoming Executive Vice President of Coral Petroleum Inc. before starting his own company, The Cernan Corporation, in 1981. In 1981 and 1982, Cernan joined Frank Reynolds and Jules Bergman on the extensive ABC coverage of the first 3 Space Shuttle launches. Many hours of these ABC broadcasts have been uploaded to YouTube in recent years. From 1987 he was a contributor to ABC News and the weekly segment of its Good Morning America program titled "Breakthrough", which covered health, science, and medicine.

In 1999, with co-author Donald A. Davis, he published his memoir The Last Man on the Moon, which is about his naval and NASA career. He is featured in the 2007 space exploration documentary In the Shadow of the Moon in which he said, "truth needs no defense" and "nobody can take those footsteps I made on the surface of the Moon away from me". Cernan also contributed to the 2007 book of the same name.

Cernan and Neil Armstrong testified before U.S. Congress in 2010 in opposition to the cancellation of the Constellation program, which had been initiated during the George W. Bush administration as part of the Vision for Space Exploration with the aim of returning humans to the Moon and eventually Mars, but was deemed underfunded and unsustainable by the Augustine Commission in 2009.

Cernan paired his criticism of the cancellation of Constellation with expressions of skepticism about Commercial Resupply Services (CRS) and Commercial Crew Development (CCDev), NASA's planned replacements for that program's role in supplying cargo and crew to the International Space Station. Such companies, Cernan warned, "do not yet know what they don't know." Cernan's view of commercial space companies—in particular SpaceX, which participates in both programs—underwent a positive shift after being debriefed by SpaceX venture capitalist Steve Jurvetson as part of his effort to obtain the signatures of nine Apollo astronauts on a photograph meant as a gift to SpaceX founder Elon Musk to commemorate the first successful SpaceX cargo mission to the ISS in 2012. Eventually, Cernan was won over and signed the photograph; "As I told him these stories of heroic entrepreneurship, I could see his mind turning." Jurvetson wrote; "He found a reconciliation: 'I never read any of this in the news. Why doesn't the press report on this?'"

Cernan gave a eulogy at Armstrong's funeral in 2012.

In 2014, Cernan appeared in the documentary The Last Man on the Moon, made by British filmmaker Mark Craig and based on Cernan's 1999 memoir of the same title. The film received the Texas Independent Film Award from Houston Film Critics Society and the Movies for Grownups Award from AARP The Magazine.

=== Personal life ===
Cernan was married twice and had one biological child and two step-children. His first wife was Barbara Jean Atchley, a flight attendant for Continental Airlines, whom he married in 1961. They had one daughter, Tracy (born in 1963); Tracy's Rock is named for her. The couple separated in 1980 and divorced in 1981. They remained friends. His second marriage was to Janis Ellen "Nanna" Cernan (née Jones; 1939–2021), which lasted for nearly 30 years from 1987 until his death. Cernan gained two step-daughters, Kelly and Danielle.

==== Death ====
Cernan died in a hospital in Houston on January 16, 2017, at the age of 82. His funeral was held at St. Martin's Episcopal Church in Houston. He was buried with full military honors at Texas State Cemetery, the first astronaut to be buried there, in a private service on January 25, 2017.

== Organizations ==
Cernan was a member of several organizations, including Fellow, American Astronautical Society; member, Society of Experimental Test Pilots; member, Tau Beta Pi (National Engineering Society), Sigma Xi (National Science Research Society), Phi Gamma Delta (National Social Fraternity), and The Explorers Club.

== Awards and honors ==
- Naval Aviator Astronaut Insignia
- Navy Distinguished Service Medal, Gold star device in lieu of second award
- Distinguished Flying Cross
- National Defense Service Medal
- NASA Distinguished Service Medal
- NASA Exceptional Service Medal
- Wright Brothers Memorial Trophy, 2007
- U.S. Astronaut Hall of Fame
- Slovakia: Grand Officer (or 2nd Class) of the Order of the White Double Cross (September 25, 1994).
- Great American Award, The All-American Boys Chorus, 2014.
- Cernan was inducted into the International Air & Space Hall of Fame at the San Diego Air & Space Museum in 2007.
- Orbital ATK announced the naming of its Cygnus CRS OA-8E Cargo Delivery Spacecraft the S.S. Gene Cernan in honor of Cernan in October 2017. The S.S. Gene Cernan successfully launched to the International Space Station on November 12, 2017.
- In 2000, Eugene Cernan was inducted into the National Aviation Hall of Fame.

Cernan, along with nine of his Gemini astronaut colleagues, was inducted into the International Space Hall of Fame in 1982.

== In popular culture ==
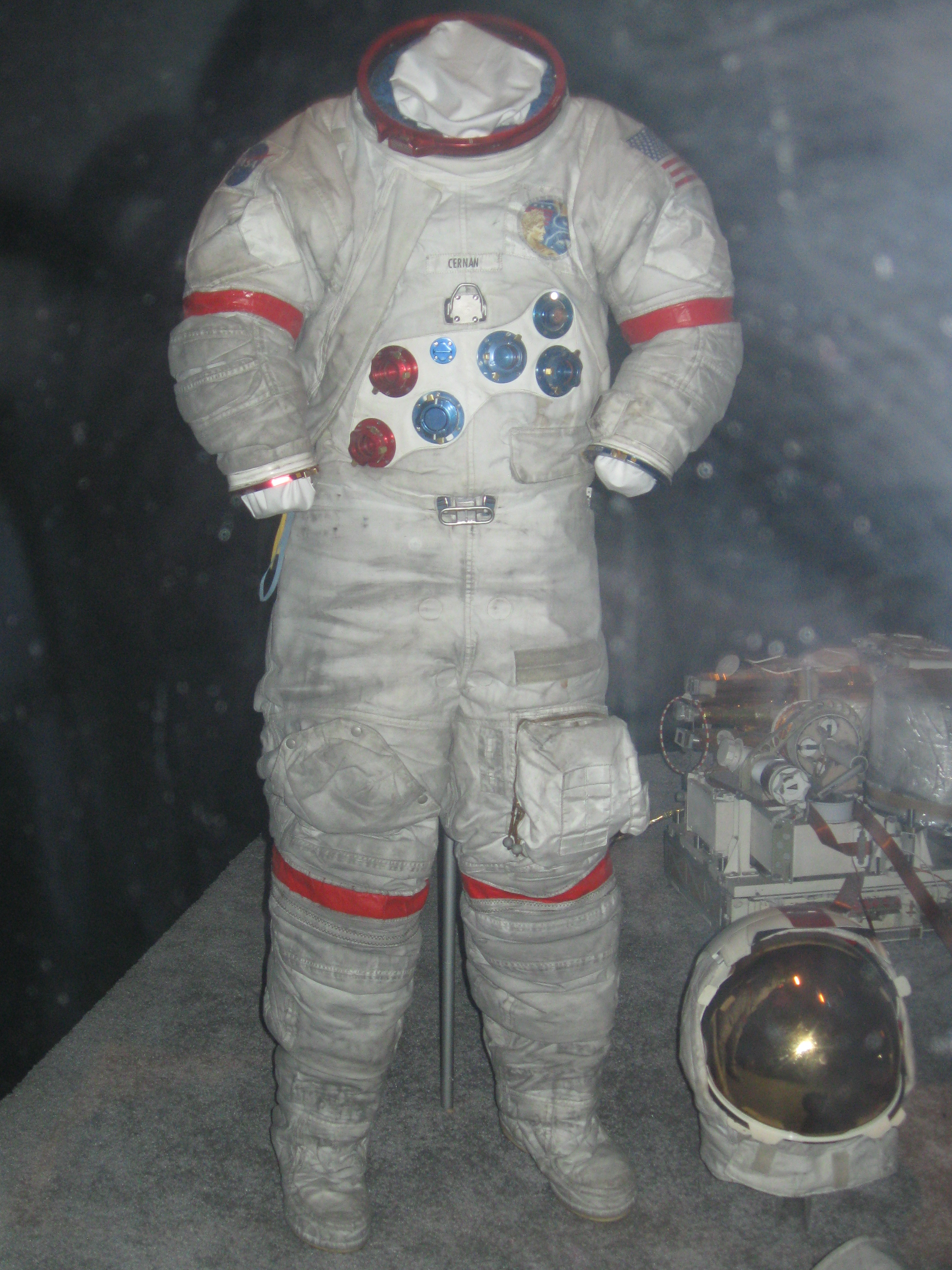
Cernan's lunar space suit on display at the National Air and Space Museum in Washington, D.C.

On July 2, 1974, Cernan was a roaster of Don Rickles on The Dean Martin Celebrity Roast. At the end of the roast, Rickles—who attended the Apollo 17 launch—paid tribute to Cernan as a "delightful, wonderful, great hero".

In the 1998 Primetime Emmy Award-winning HBO miniseries From the Earth to the Moon, Cernan was portrayed by Daniel Hugh Kelly.

The audio commentary for the Criterion Collection release of the film For All Mankind was recorded by Cernan and director Al Reinert in 1999.

Cernan was featured in the Discovery Channel's 2008 documentary miniseries When We Left Earth: The NASA Missions, talking about his involvement and missions as an astronaut.

A popular belief is that Cernan wrote his daughter's initials on a rock on the Moon, Tracy's Rock. The story, and Cernan's relationship with his daughter, was later adapted into "Tracy's Song" by pop-rock band No More Kings. The story is inaccurate, as Cernan wrote her initials in the dust, not on a rock. He states in the 2014 documentary The Last Man on the Moon that he wrote them in the lunar dust as he left the rover to return to the LM and Earth. The true story of leaving the initials on the lunar surface was prominently mentioned in "The Last Walt", a 2012 episode of Modern Family.

A recording of Cernan's voice during the Apollo 17 mission was sampled by Daft Punk for "Contact", the last track on their 2013 album Random Access Memories. Cernan's last words from the lunar surface, along with Lunar Module Pilot Harrison Schmitt's recollections, were used by the band Public Service Broadcasting for the song "Tomorrow", the final track of their 2015 album The Race for Space.

The Apple TV+ show For All Mankind dramatizes the Moon landings. The fictional main character Gordon Stevens draws comparisons to and shares similarity with the commander of the Apollo 17 mission, Gene Cernan.

== See also ==
- List of spaceflight records
- The Astronaut Monument, Iceland
- Cernan Earth and Space Center, a public planetarium on the campus of Triton College in River Grove, Illinois named in Cernan's honor.
