= Mackin (crater) =

Crater on the Moon

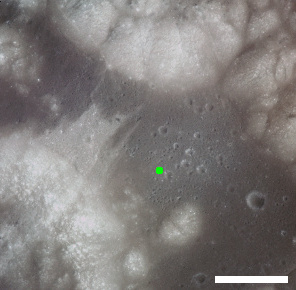
- Location of Mackin crater in Taurus–Littrow valley. South Massif is at lower left, North Massif is at top center, and Sculptured Hills are at upper right. Scale bar is 5 km
- Coordinates: 20.10°N 30.73°E
- Diameter: 480 m
- Eponym: Astronaut-named feature

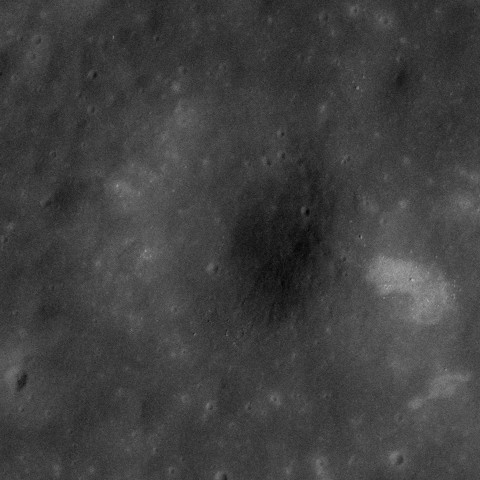
Apollo 17 panoramic camera image

Mackin is a feature on Earth's Moon, a crater in Taurus–Littrow valley. Astronauts Eugene Cernan and Harrison Schmitt landed north of it in 1972, on the Apollo 17 mission, but did not visit it.

Mackin is adjacent to the similarly sized crater Hess. To the north is Camelot, to the northwest are Shorty and Lara, and to the west is Nansen. To the northeast is Emory.

The crater was named by the astronauts after geologist Joseph Hoover Mackin.
