= Campbell Dallas Edgar =

United States Navy admiral (1889–1961)

- Born: August 23, 1889; Washington, D.C., U.S.
- Died: June 24, 1961 (aged 71); Monterey, California, U.S.
- Burial place: Golden Gate National Cemetery
- Military career
- Allegiance: United States
- Branch: United States Navy
- Service years: 1912–1946
- Rank: Rear Admiral
- Commands: USS Smith Thompson; USS William P. Biddle
- Conflicts: World War I World War II

Campbell Dallas Edgar (23 August 1889 – 24 June 1961) was a United States Navy admiral whose military service extended through World War I and included command of divisions of troopships in the Western Naval Task Force landing operations in North Africa, Sicily, Italy, Normandy, and Southern France during World War II.

== Early life and education ==
Edgar was born 23 August 1889 in Washington, D.C. He was a son of Webster and Matilda (Emory) Edgar, and named after his maternal grandfather Campbell Dallas Emory. Edgar was commissioned as an ensign upon graduation from the United States Naval Academy in 1912.

== Naval career ==
Following commissioning, Edgar briefly served aboard the battleship USS Michigan prior to a two year tour of duty aboard the battleship USS Florida. In 1914 he was part of the crew who reactivated the destroyer USS Smith for neutrality patrol duty off Boston, Massachusetts. During that assignment he was promoted to Lieutenant (junior grade) in 1916 and assigned to the commissioning crew of the destroyer USS Sampson. In 1918 he was promoted to Lieutenant with the commissioning crew of the destroyer USS Delphy.

Edgar was United States Naval Academy instructor in the Department of Electrical Engineering and Physics from 1919 to 1921. He then spent a year decommissioning the destroyer USS Stockton before transferring to the battleship USS Nevada where he was promoted to Lieutenant commander. In 1924 he was transferred to shore duty with a year at United States Naval Station Tutuila followed by another year as United States Naval Academy instructor in the Department of Electrical Engineering and Physics. He was chief engineer of the battleship USS New York from 1926 to 1929 before spending two years with the 13th Naval district.

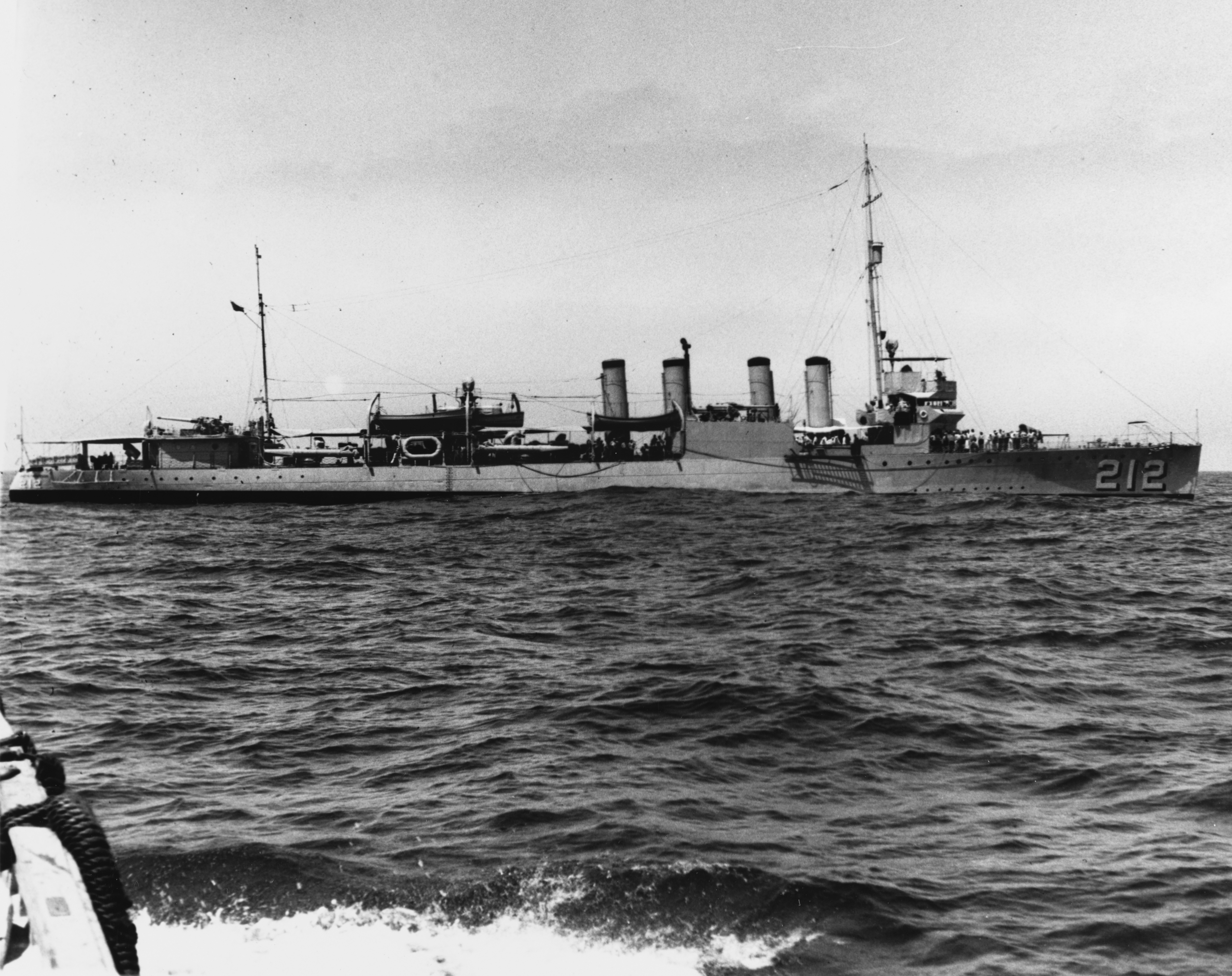
Edgar commanded the destroyer USS Smith Thompson on the Yangtze Patrol.

With the rank of Commander Edgar was captain of the destroyer USS Smith Thompson from 1931 to 1933 before serving as communications officer with the 18th and 11th Naval districts until 1937. He was executive officer of the cruiser USS Louisville from 1937 to 1939. He was promoted to Captain while serving as Radio Material Officer at Naval Base Pearl Harbor before serving with the 12th Naval district and assuming command of the attack transport USS William P. Biddle from 1941 to 1942. He subsequently commanded Transport Division 5 for Operation Torch, Transport Division 11 for Operation Husky, and Transport Division 3 for Operation Avalanche.

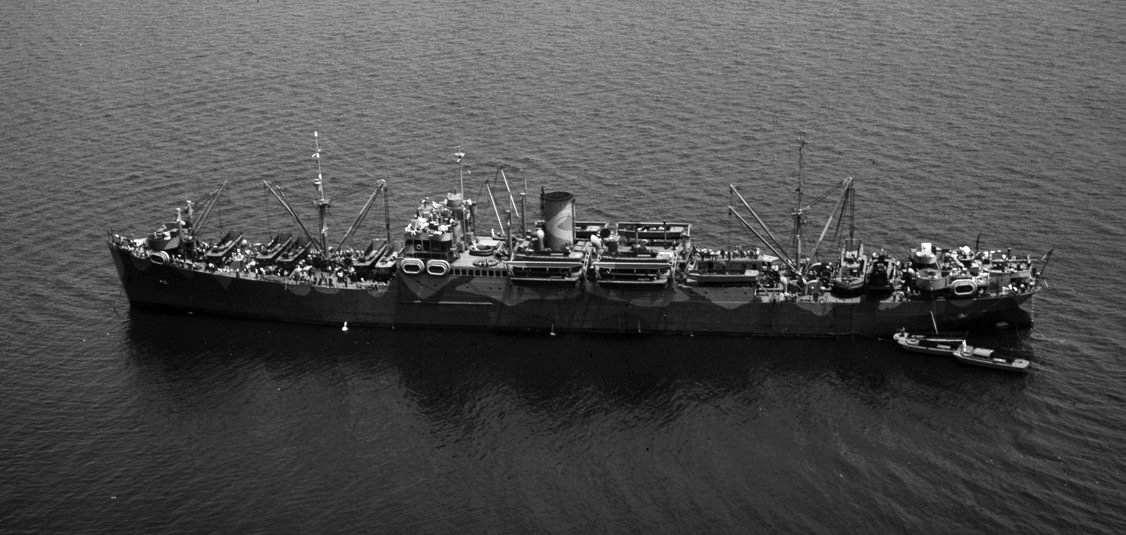
Edgar's command of the troopship USS William P. Biddle began his distinguished service with the amphibious invasions of World War II.

Edgar was promoted to Commodore in 1943 and commanded Follow-up Force B at the Normandy landings. After serving as Commander of Transports for Operation Dragoon in August 1944, he transferred to the Pacific Fleet. He was Commander of Transports for the 11th Amphibious Force until January 1945 when he became Commander of Transport Squadron 19 tasked with training the Pacific Fleet amphibious forces. He served at the Puget Sound Naval Shipyard from July until he retired in 1946.

== Awards ==
Edgar's awards include:

- Navy Distinguished Service Medal
- Legion of Merit (4)
- Mexican Service Medal
- World War I Victory Medal with Destroyer Clasp
- Yangtze Service Medal
- American Defense Service Medal with Base Clasp
- European–African–Middle Eastern Campaign Medal
- World War II Victory Medal
