= Hess-Apollo (crater) =

Lunar crater

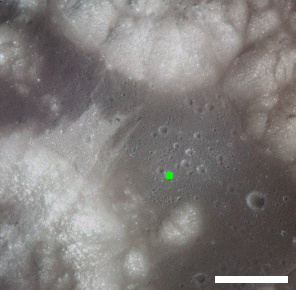
- Location of Hess-Apollo crater in Taurus–Littrow valley. South Massif is at lower left, North Massif is at top center, and Sculptured Hills are at upper right. Scale bar is 5 km
- Coordinates: 20.09°N 30.75°E
- Diameter: 380 m
- Eponym: Astronaut-named feature

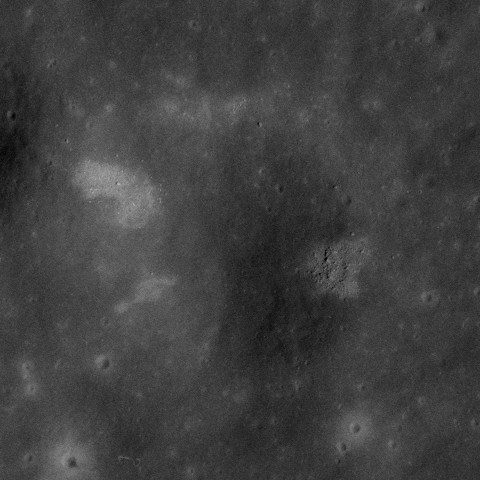
Apollo 17 panoramic camera image

Hess-Apollo is a feature on Earth's Moon, a crater in Taurus–Littrow valley. Astronauts Eugene Cernan and Harrison Schmitt landed north of it in 1972, on the Apollo 17 mission, but did not visit it. The astronauts referred to it simply as Hess during the mission.

Hess is adjacent to the similarly sized crater Mackin. To the north is Camelot, to the northwest are Shorty and Lara, and to the west is Nansen. To the northeast is Emory.

The crater was named by the astronauts after geologist Harry Hammond Hess.
