= USS Smith Thompson =

Clemson-class destroyer

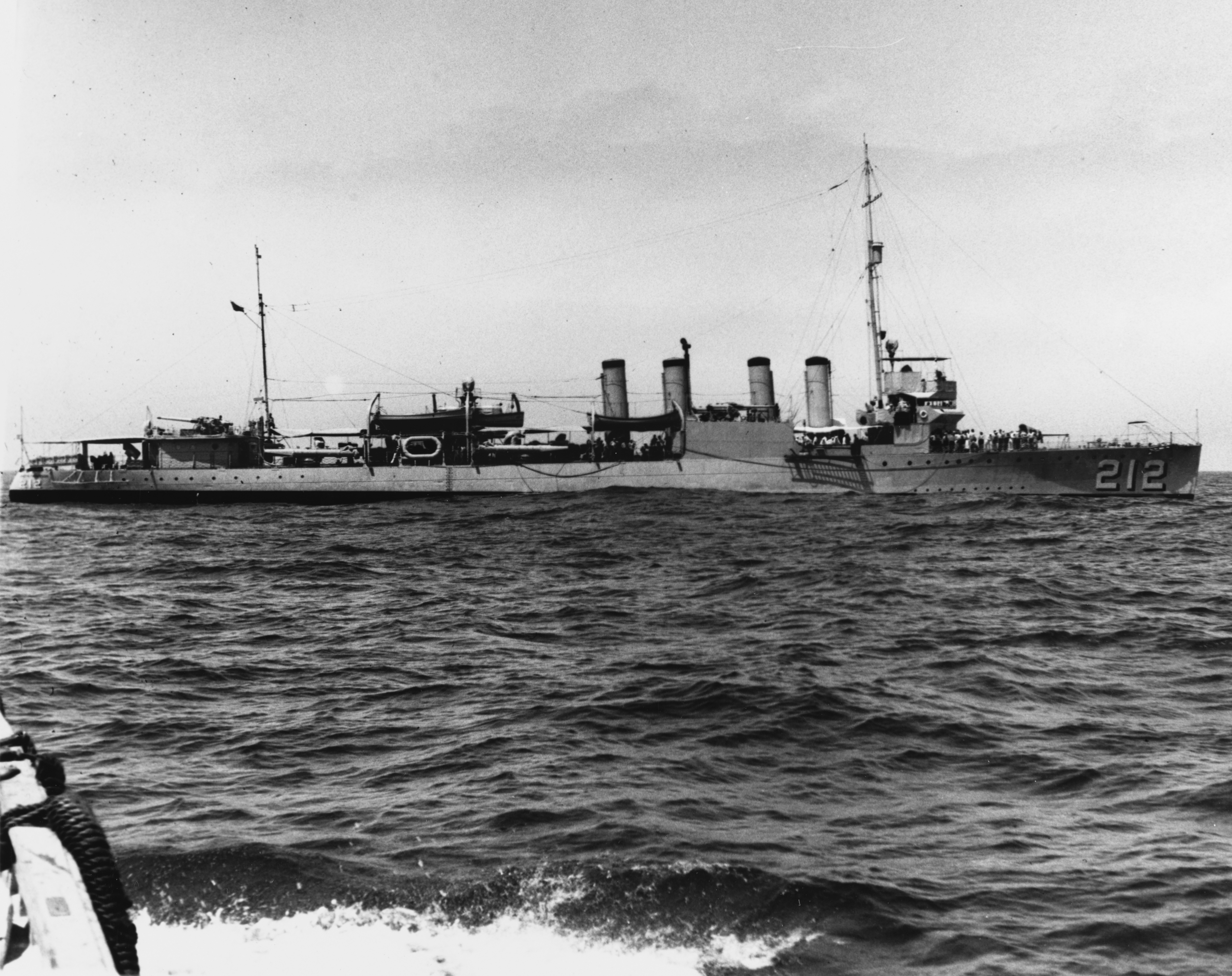
- Smith Thompson in the summer of 1935

History

United States
- Namesake: Smith Thompson
- Builder: William Cramp & Sons, Philadelphia
- Yard number: 478
- Laid down: 24 March 1919
- Launched: 14 July 1919
- Commissioned: 10 December 1919
- Decommissioned: 15 May 1936
- Stricken: 19 May 1936
- Fate: Deemed beyond repair due to collision; sunk as a target, 25 July 1936

General characteristics
- Class & type: Clemson-class destroyer
- Displacement: 1,215 tons
- Length: 314 feet 4 1/2 inches (95.822 m)
- Beam: 31 feet 8 inches (9.65 m)
- Draft: 9 feet 4 inches (2.84 m)
- Propulsion: 26,500 shp (20 MW); geared turbines, 2 screws
- Speed: 35 knots (65 km/h)
- Complement: 121 officers and enlisted
- Armament: 4 × 4 in (100 mm) guns, 1 × 3 in (76 mm) gun, 12 × 21 inch (533 mm) TT.

USS Smith Thompson (DD-212) was a Clemson-class destroyer in service with the United States Navy from 1919 to 1936. She was intentionally sunk following a collision with USS Whipple (DD-217), in July 1936.

== History ==
Smith Thompson named for Secretary of the Navy Smith Thompson. She was laid down on 24 March 1919 by William Cramp & Sons, Philadelphia; launched on 14 July 1919; sponsored by Mrs. Kate E. Lloyd, granddaughter of Secretary Thompson; and commissioned on 10 December 1919.

After shakedown along the United States East Coast, Smith Thompson sailed on 8 February 1920 from Philadelphia for the Mediterranean, arriving at Constantinople on 25 February. Attached to the United States Naval Detachment in Turkish Waters, Rear Admiral Mark L. Bristol commanding, the destroyer operated in the eastern Mediterranean and the Black Sea for over a year, visiting ports in Turkey, Russia, Romania, Bulgaria, Syria, Greece, Egypt and Palestine. Due to warfare in Turkey and Russia, Admiral Bristol's ships were frequently assigned unusual tasks, including maintenance of radio, mail, and passenger service; carrying State Department representatives and officials of recognized philanthropic societies to various ports; and evacuation of Americans, non-combatants, and the sick and wounded from ports threatened by warfare, particularly in southern Russia. Rear Admiral Newton A. McCully, on a mission to south Russia as a special agent of the State Department for observation purposes, received assistance from the naval forces; and, on several occasions, Smith Thompson acted as his flagship.

On 2 May 1921, Smith Thompson sailed from Constantinople with her division for the Asiatic Station, arriving at Cavite, Philippines, on 29 June. For the next four years, she cruised among the Philippine Islands, along the coast of China, and in Japanese waters, protecting American lives and property and carrying out peacetime training.

In early September 1923, when he learned that Tokyo and Yokohama had been nearly destroyed by an earthquake, tsunami, and fire on 30 and 31 August, Admiral Edwin Anderson, Jr., Commander in Chief of the Asiatic Fleet, immediately sent Smith Thompson and her destroyer division with medical supplies to render assistance. Smith Thompson arrived on 5 September and acted as radio relay ship at Yokohama and station ship at Tokyo until departing on 21 September. The American destroyers were the first foreign vessels to arrive at Yokohama and earned the gratitude of the Japanese government. The following year, Smith Thompson carried out another special mission, providing support off the China coast between 7 and 10 June for the flight of four United States Army aircraft around the world. Smith Thompson returned to the U.S. East Coast in 1925 via San Diego, California and the Panama Canal, arriving in Hampton Roads on 16 July.

After overhaul, Smith Thompson joined Destroyer Squadrons, Scouting Fleet, and cruised along the U.S. East Coast and in the Caribbean on training exercises. During September and October 1926 and January 1927, the destroyer was temporarily attached to the U.S. Special Service Squadron for duty on the coast of Nicaragua, observing conditions in that country during a revolutionary outbreak, protecting American interests, and furnishing transportation to Naval and Marine Corps personnel.

Between June 1927 and January 1928, Smith Thompson cruised in the Mediterranean and the Adriatic, and then proceeded to the United States West Coast to join Destroyer Squadrons, Battle Fleet. On 1 August 1929, she sailed from Bremerton, Washington, with her division for a second tour with the Asiatic Fleet. Arriving at Chefoo, China, on 2 September 1929; Smith Thompson participated in exercises with the fleet in Chinese and Philippine waters, with overhaul periods at the Cavite Navy Yard, until 1936. Due to civil war and bandit activity, a division of destroyers had to be maintained in Chinese waters in addition to the regular gunboat patrols; and Smith Thompson was, on several occasions, assigned temporary duty with the Yangtze River Patrol and the South China Patrol. Commanded by Campbell Dallas Edgar on 1 February 1932, she, with other units of the Asiatic Fleet, was rushed to Shanghai to protect the international settlement there after the Japanese launched an air and sea attack on the Chinese portion of the city. On this occasion, Smith Thompson remained on special patrols along the China coast until 28 May.

== Fate ==
On 14 April 1936, Smith Thompson, while en route from Manila to Shanghai, was rammed amidships by Whipple (DD-217). There was no loss of life, but Smith Thompson was seriously damaged and had to be towed back to the Philippines by Barker (DD-213), arriving in Subic Bay on 17 April. Inspection showed the ship not worth repair, and Smith Thompson was decommissioned at Olongapo on 15 May, struck from the Navy list on 19 May, and sunk at sea off Subic Bay on 25 July 1936.

As of 2019, no other ships have been named Smith Thompson.
