= Emory (crater) =

Lunar impact crater in the Taurus–Littrow valley

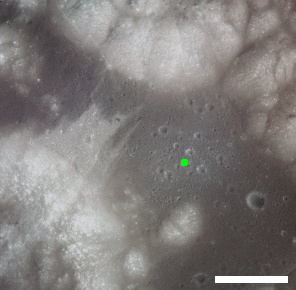
- Location of Emory crater in Taurus–Littrow valley. South Massif is at lower left, North Massif is at top center, and Sculptured Hills are at upper right. Scale bar is 5 km
- Coordinates: 20.12°N 30.78°E
- Diameter: 550 m
- Eponym: Astronaut-named feature

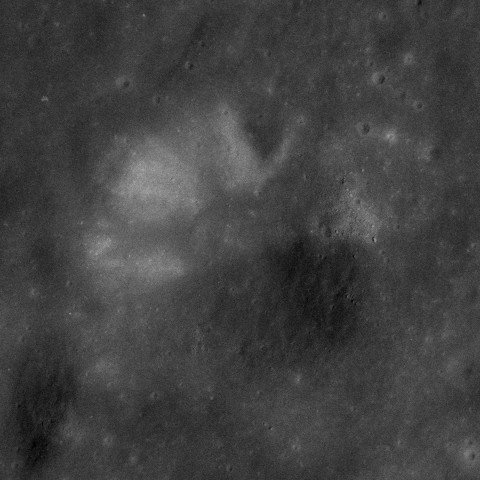
Apollo 17 panoramic camera image

Emory is a feature on Earth's Moon, a crater in Taurus–Littrow valley. Astronauts Eugene Cernan and Harrison Schmitt landed north of it in 1972, on the Apollo 17 mission, but did not visit it. The name was approved in 1973.

Emory is south of Steno crater and Geology Station 1. To the southwest are Mackin and Hess.

The crater was named by the astronauts after explorer and surveyor William H. Emory.
