= William H. Emory =

Union Army general (1811–1887)

William Hemsley Emory
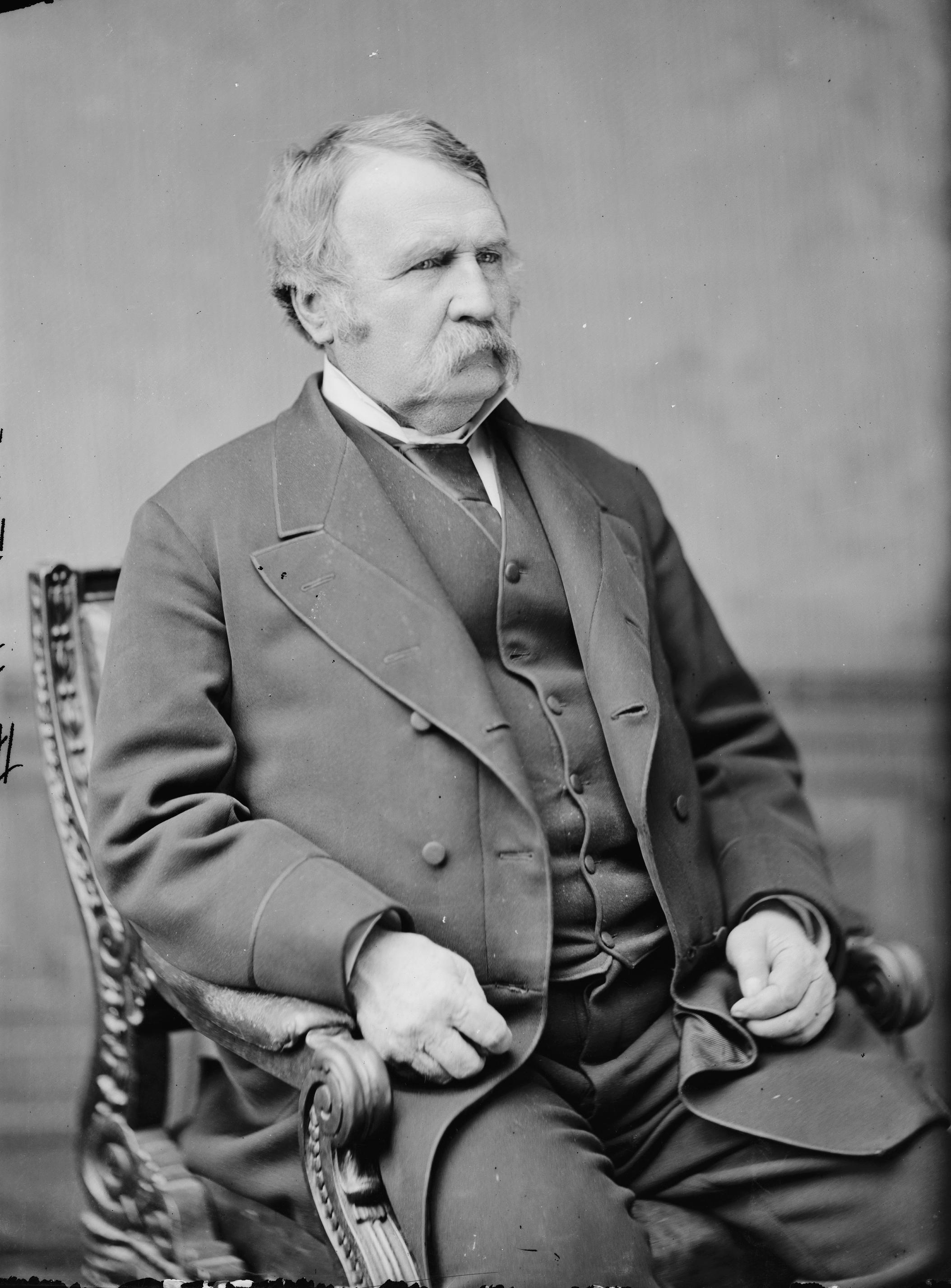
- Born: September 7, 1811; Queen Anne's County, Maryland, U.S.
- Died: December 1, 1887 (aged 76); Washington, D.C., U.S.
- Burial place: Congressional Cemetery
- Military career
- Allegiance: United States; Union
- Branch: United States Army; Union Army
- Service years: 1831–1836, 1838–1876
- Rank: Major General
- Commands: XIX Corps
- Conflicts: Creek War of 1836; Mexican–American War; Conquest of California; Battle of San Pasqual; Battle of Río San Gabriel; Battle of La Mesa; Bleeding Kansas; Utah War; American Civil War; Peninsula campaign; Battle of Yorktown; Battle of Williamsburg; Battle of Hanover Court House; Battle of Fort Bisland; Siege of Port Hudson; Battle of LaFourche Crossing; Second Battle of Donaldsonville; Red River campaign; Battle of Sabine Cross Roads; Battle of Pleasant Hill; Battle of Monett's Ferry; Battle of Mansura; Valley campaigns of 1864; Third Battle of Winchester; Battle of Fisher's Hill; Battle of Cedar Creek
- Other work: Surveyor

William Hemsley Emory (September 7, 1811 – December 1, 1887) was a prominent American surveyor and civil engineer of the 19th century. As an officer in the U.S. Army Corps of Topographical Engineers he specialized in mapping the United States border, including the Texas–Mexico border, and the Gadsden Purchase border, 1844–1855, and published lasting scientific reports on the border region.

== Early life and early career ==
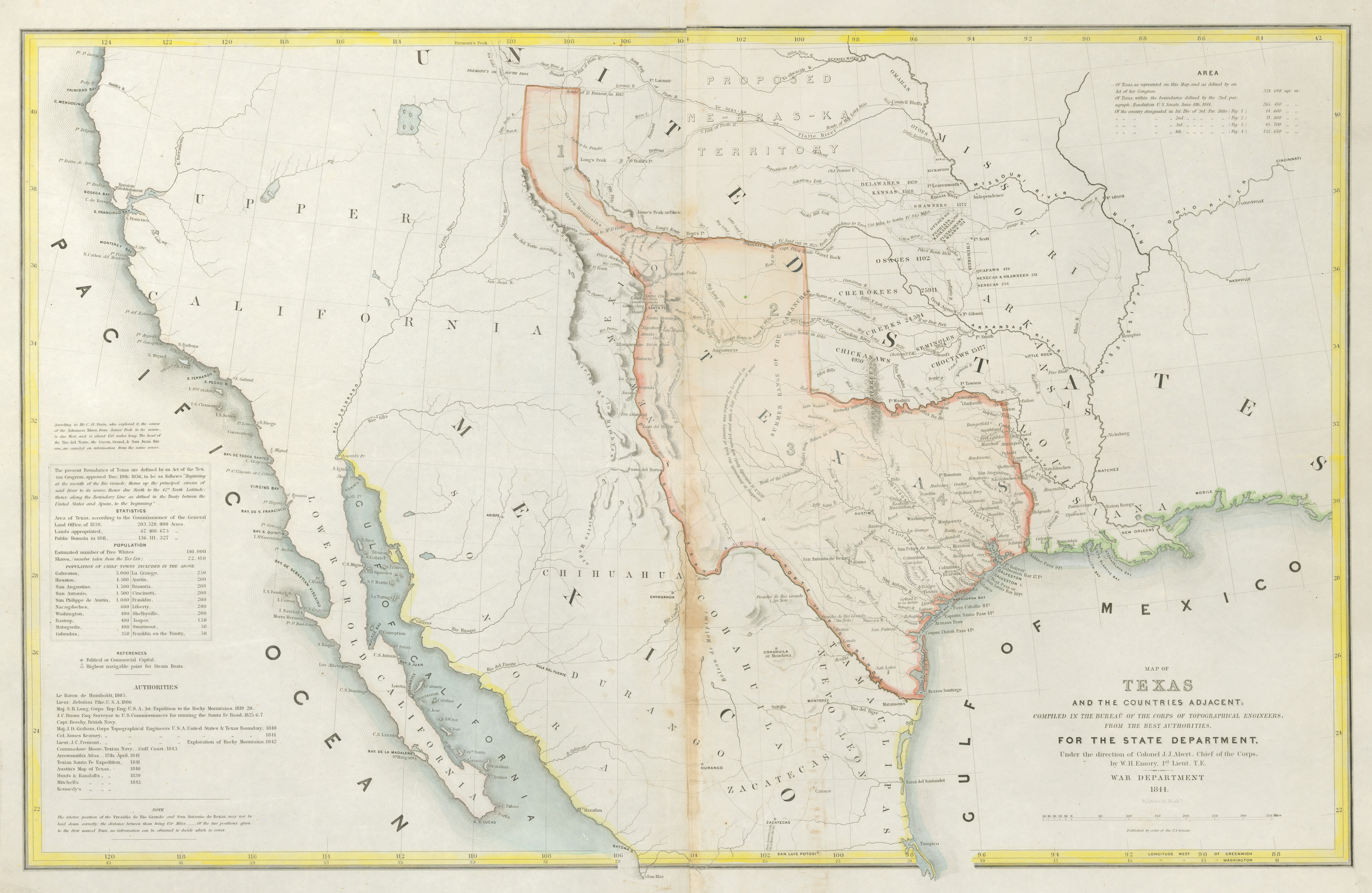
Emory's 1844 Map of Texas and the Countries Adjacent

Emory was born in Queen Anne's County, Maryland, on his family's "Poplar Grove" estate. He attended the United States Military Academy at West Point, New York, and graduated in 1831. Assigned as a second lieutenant, he served in the Fourth Artillery until he resigned from the service in 1836 to pursue civil engineering, but he returned to the service in 1838 as lieutenant in the newly formed Corps of Topographical Engineers.

William H. Emory was most importantly a topographical engineer and explorer. From 1839 to 1842, he surveyed harbors and the Delaware River. In 1844, Emory served in an expedition that produced a new map of Texan claims westward to the Rio Grande, which brought him national attention as the war with Mexico seemed imminent. He next conducted a boundary survey of the Canada–United States border (1844–1846). His mapmaking skills were so superb and detailed with such great accuracy that he often made other maps obsolete, thus making him the authority of the trans-Mississippi west.

== Mexican–American War and Gadsden Purchase ==
At the start of the Mexican–American War, Emory was selected to join General Stephen Watts Kearny and the Army of the West to take New Mexico and California. Along the way he kept a detailed journal of the march down the Rio Grande and across to the Gila River, and down it to its mouth on the Colorado River, then to the Pacific coast. Published by the Thirtieth United States Congress in 1848 as Notes of a Military Reconnaissance from Fort Leavenworth to San Diego, it became an important guide book for the road to Southern California. This report described terrain and rivers, cities and forts and made observations about Native Americans and Mexicans, primarily in the future New Mexico Territory, Arizona Territory and Southern California. It was and is considered one of the important chronicles and descriptions of the historic Southwest, particularly noted for its maps. Emory was a reliable and conscientious cartographer.

After the War, Emory was sent with a crew to survey the new Mexico–United States border, first from the mouth of the Gila across California to the coast and then second, with the Bartlett survey from El Paso west, 1849–1853. A dispute arose among the Mexicans and Americans over the location of the starting line near El Paso caused by an error in the original map referred to in the 1848 Treaty of Guadalupe Hidalgo. A compromise by John Russell Bartlett caused an international incident when neither side agreed to the boundary and threatened renewed hostilities in the Mesilla Valley above El Paso. A compromise was reached with the Gadsden Purchase of 1854, and Emory was selected to lead the American boundary commission to survey, 1855–1856, the new boundary line (earlier he had influenced the debate over approving the treaty by advising Senator Thomas Jefferson Rusk of Texas on the best route for a southern transcontinental railroad, one of the important points of the Gadsden Treaty).

There is a story of testament as to Emory's dedication to accuracy that says John Bartlett, his supervisor in the boundary survey, made him sign off on a misplaced boundary marker, creating a sweet revenge for Emory who replaced him as Head of the International Boundary Commission in 1855. But William H. Emory did more than just map the terrain; he also made notes about the plant life as well as the people who inhabited the sparsely populated Southwest. Notating the social relations of some of the Native American people, he wrote: "Women, when captured, are taken as wives by those who capture them, but they are treated by the Indian wives of the capturers as slaves, and made to carry wood and water; if they chance to be pretty, or receive too much attention from their lords and masters, they are, in the absence of the latter, unmercifully beaten and otherwise maltreated. The most unfortunate thing which can befall a captive woman is to be claimed by two persons. In this case, she is either shot or delivered up for indiscriminate violence."[2] His multi-volume boundary survey published as the Report of the United States and Mexican Boundary Commission, Made Under the Direction of the Secretary of the Interior, 2 vols (Washington, GPO, 1857–1859, reprint Austin:Texas Historical Association, 1987) was not only a contribution to understanding the geography of the region but was a long-standing scientific contribution to the natural history of the region.

== American Civil War ==
In 1861, when the American Civil War broke out, Emory was stationed in the Indian Territory. Anticipating the possible capture of his troops by Confederates, he secured the services of Black Beaver, a famous Lenape warrior, to guide Emory's troops to safety. He promised that the government would compensate Black Beaver for the loss of his ranch. Emory withdrew Union troops from Fort Washita to Fort Leavenworth. During the withdrawal, Black Beaver scouted pursuing enemy troops, and Emory attacked and captured lead elements of his pursuers, the first prisoners captured during the Civil War.

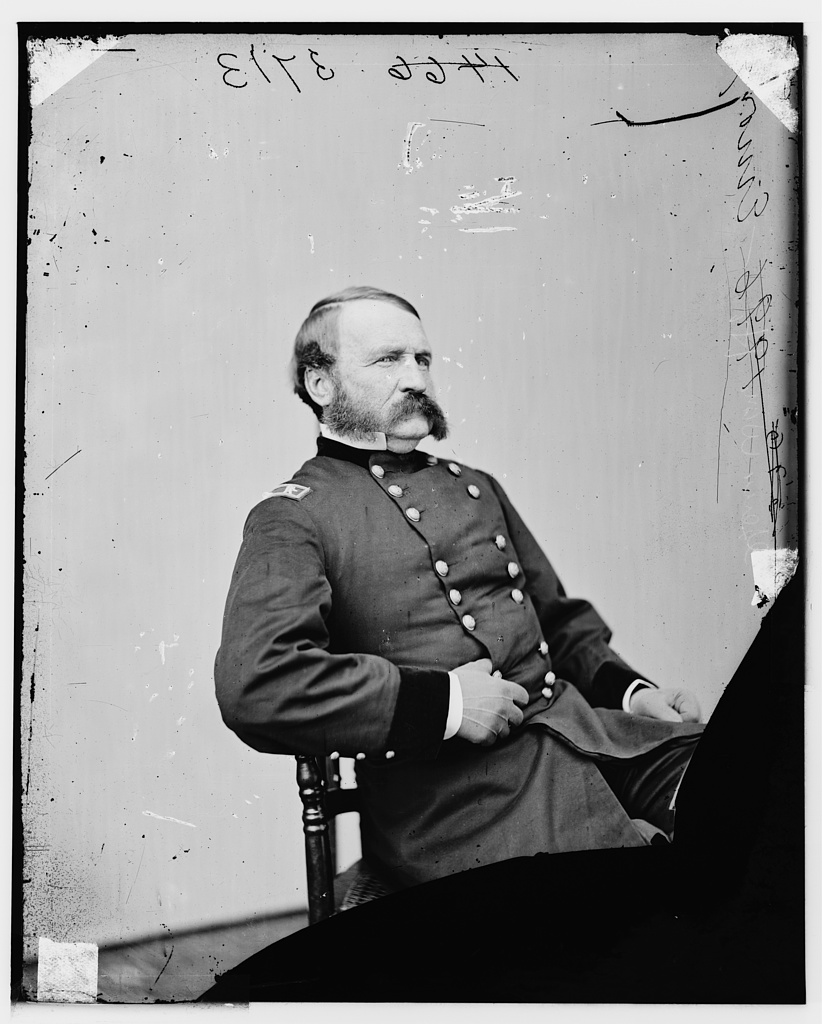
William H. Emory (Brady-Handy collection, Library of Congress

)

At the onset of the Civil War, Emory was concerned for his family and wrote a letter of resignation on May 9, 1861. He immediately regretted his decision and tried to prevent the delivery of the letter but was unable to do so. In spite of his resignation letter, he was informally commissioned as major general of the 3rd, later 6th, Cavalry. However, an official review was required that included testimony on his behalf from General Winfield Scott and Lieutenant A. V. Colburn, as well as Emory's own testimony to Secretary of War and the Senate before his resignation was formally rescinded and his rank was officially confirmed.

Emory served as a brigade commander in the Army of the Potomac in 1862, and was transferred to the Western Theater. He was promoted to brigadier general of volunteers on March 17, 1862. He later commanded a division in the Port Hudson campaign. He subsequently returned to the East as the commander of the Nineteenth Corps, serving in all the major battles in the Shenandoah Valley Campaign of 1864, especially at the Battle of Cedar Creek, where Emory's actions helped save the Union army from a devastating defeat until Maj. Gen. Philip Sheridan's arrival.

At the end of the war, Emory held the rank of colonel in the regular army and a brevet (honorary promotion) as major general. He was promoted to major general in the volunteers on September 25, 1865, and was mustered out of the volunteers on January 15, 1866.

== Postbellum ==
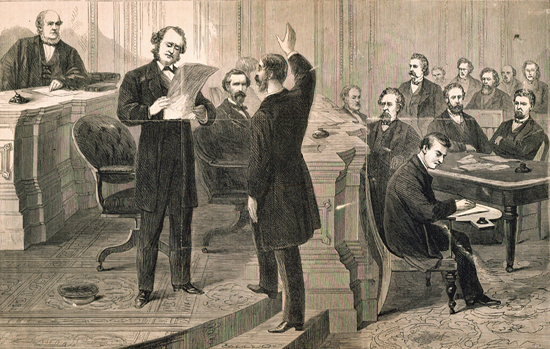
Illustration of Secretary of the United States Senate John Weiss Forney administering oath to Emory during the impeachment trial of Andrew Johnson

After the war, Emory held a number of posts, most importantly commander of the Department of the Gulf (which included the Federal troops in Louisiana, Arkansas, and Mississippi)–a demanding and dangerous Reconstruction assignment. On April 2, 1868, he testified in the impeachment trial of President Andrew Johnson, having been called as a witness by the prosecution.

In September 1874, President Ulysses S. Grant ordered Emory to New Orleans, where he successfully negotiated a peace with the conservative White League who had taken over the city by military force. As a result, Republican Governor Kellogg was restored to power and the White League disbanded. For political reasons, General Sheridan removed Emory from command and saw to it that he was retired in 1876. The Department of the Gulf was soon shifted to Sheridan's large Division of the Missouri, which included Texas.

He was a companion of the Military Order of the Loyal Legion of the United States. In 1879 he became a Veteran Member of the Aztec Club of 1847.

== Marriage and family ==
Emory married Matilda Wilkins Bache on May 29, 1838, in Philadelphia, Pennsylvania. Bache was the daughter of Richard Bache Jr. and Sophia Burrell Dallas. She was a granddaughter of Sarah Franklin Bache and Richard Bache, and a great-granddaughter of Benjamin Franklin, as well as a niece of George Mifflin Dallas, the 11th Vice President of the United States, serving under James K. Polk.

Emory and his wife had a total of 10 children. His eldest son, Brevet Lieut. Colonel Campbell Dallas Emory, 9th United States Infantry, was Aide de Camp to Major General George G. Meade during the Civil War, and a younger son, William H. Emory Jr., was a rear admiral in the United States Navy.

He was also a first cousin of Bishop John Emory.

== Death ==
Emory died December 1, 1887, in Washington, D.C. He is buried in the Congressional Cemetery there.

== Commemoration ==
While attending the United States Military Academy at West Point, he earned the nickname "Bold Emory".

Emory Pass, 8,228 feet, in the Black Range of southwest New Mexico was named for him.

Emory Peak (7,825 ft) in Big Bend National Park is named for him.

Fort Emory was named for him in 1942. It is now used as a training area for Special Forces.

In 1853, Baird and Girard named the Great Plains rat snake, Pantherophis emoryi, for Emory. The first specimens of this snake species were collected by John H. Clark and Arthur Schott at Howard Springs, Texas, under Emory's leadership during the United States and Mexican Boundary Survey. Emory is also commemorated in the scientific name of the Texas spiny softshell turtle, Apalone spinifera emoryi, Emory's crucifixion thorn (Castela emoryi) of the plant family Simaroubaceae, the cacti Grusonia emoryi and Bergerocactus emoryi, as well as the genus Emorya in the Buddleja tribe of the plant family Scrophulariaceae.

Emory Elementary School in San Diego bears his namesake, and is located 2.5 miles (4.0 km) north of the border which he determined between the United States and Mexico from the Colorado River to San Diego/Tijuana, near the border's western end.

The astronauts of Apollo 17 named a small crater after him.

== Publications ==
- Buttery, L. M., Robert Lenon, and William H. Emory. "The Emory Maps of 1847 & 1857". Lampasas, Tex: Old Maps of the Southwest, 1987. Issue no. 6. part 2, Fall 1987. Title of reproduced 1847 map: Military reconnaissance of the Arkansas, Rio Del Norte and Rio Gila. Title of pamphlet and accompanying map: Accuracy of Emory's 1846 Longitudes. Pamphlet includes essays by Lewis M. Buttery and Robert Lenon. Scale of reproduced map is ca. 1:2,000,000. Scale of 1984 map is ca. 1;1,000,000. 1 portfolio: 3 maps on 29 sheets, and 1 pamphlet; 30 cm. Series title: Old maps of the Southwest, no. 6, pt. 2. Other titles: Military reconnaissance of the Arkansas Rio del Norte and Rio Gila; Accuracy of Emory's 1846 longitudes.
- Emory, William H., John James Abert, and William James Stone. of Texas and the Countries Adjacent. [Washington, D.C.]: War Department, 1844. Relief shown by hachures. Shows northern Mexico, southwestern U.S., and Texas as defined by Act of the Texian Congress, December 19, 1836; includes routes, Indian tribes, battle sites, etc. "Published by order of the U.S. Senate." Prime meridians: Greenwich and Washington. Scanned raster image of original: 1 map on 2 sheets; 54 x 81 cm., folded in cover 17 x 11 cm. Original in the David Rumsey Collection; scanned by Cartography Associates.
- Emory, William Hemsley, Report on the United States and Mexican Boundary Survey (2 vols., Washington: Nicholson, 1857, 1859; rpt., Austin: Texas State Historical Association, 1987). ISBN 0-87611-085-5.
- EMORY, William H., John Charles Frémont, Robert MILLS, and WISLIZENUS. Map of the Country between the Atlantic & Pacific Oceans included within the latitudes 25 & 42 & the longitudes 75 & 123 West, shewing the proposed route of a Rail Road from the Mississippi Valley to the ports of St. Diego, Monterey & St. Francisco on the Pacific Coast, etc. Compiled ... by R. Mills, Eng. 1848.
- Emory, William Hemsley, Notes of a Military Reconnaissance (Washington and New York, 1848; rpt., by the U.S. Army Corps of Topographical Engineers, as Lieutenant Emory Reports, with intro. and notes by Ross Calvin [Albuquerque: University of New Mexico Press, 1951]).
- Emory, William H. Sketch of the Passage of the Rio San Gabriel, Upper California: By the Americans, Discomfiting the Opposing Mex. Forces, Jan. 8. 1847. Washington?: s.n, 1848.
- Emory, William H. Sketch of the Actions Fought at San Pasqual in Upper California between the Americans and the Mexicans, Dec. 6 & 7, 1846. S.l: s.n, 1846. Relief shown by hachures. See: William Hemsley Emory's "Notes of a military reconnaissance," Washington, 1848.
- Emory, William H. Sketch of the Battle of Los Angeles Upper California: Fought between the Americans and Mexicans Jany. 9th. 1847. Washington, D.C.?: s.n, 1847. Relief shown by hachures. See: Emory's Notes of a military reconnaissance. 1848.
- Emory, William H., A. D. Bache, and William Cranch Bond. Discussion of Observations for the Isodynamic, Isogonic, and Isoclinal Curves of Terrestrial Magnetism on and Near the Line of the Boundary Survey between the United States and Mexico, Made in 1849, 1850, 1851, and 1852, Under the Orders of W.H. Emory, Astronomer of the Boundary Commission, and Combined with Observations at San Francisco (California), and Dollar Point (East Base), and Jupiter (Texas), Furnished by A.D. Bache, Superintendent of the United States Coast Survey, with a Map. Cambridge, Mass.?: s.n, 1855. Reprinted from: Memoirs of the American Academy of Arts and Sciences, v. 5, n.s., 1855?
- Emory, William H. Observations, Astronomical, Magnetic, and Meteorological: Made at Chagres and Gorgona, Isthmus of Darien, and at the City of Panama, New Grenada. Cambridge: Metcalf and Company, 1850. 24 pages. Chiefly tables. "From the Memoirs of the American Academy." Second leaf blank.
- Emory, William H., Matilda Emory, J. R. Emory, Winfield Scott, A. V. Colburn, and James Longstreet. Papers of William Emory. 1861. Abstract: Correspondence, notes, and a biographical sketch documenting the life and career of William H. Emory.
- Emory, William H. William Hemsley Emory Papers. 1823. Yale University Library. Abstract: The bulk of the collection documents William Emory's service on the Mexican boundary survey in the years 1848 to 1858. Series I contains correspondence with members of the boundary commission, the American and Mexican Survey parties, and government officials. Correspondence for 1849-50 describes California during the Gold Rush and Forty-Niners on the Gila route. There are also other military records. Series II contains letters and other records from Emory's service in Kansas and in the Civil War.
- Emory, William H., J. McClelland, and James Kearney. Experimental Survey for the Eastern Shore Rail Road, Maryland, Drawn by W.H. Emory & J. McClelland Asst. Civ. Engs., Made Under the Direction of James Kearney. 1853. Abstract: Survey map along route of line covering strip of land in Maryland from Elk Landing to Tangier Sound. Shows streams, fields, land owners, roads, and the "lines run with compass & level, Lines run with compass." The line was chartered in 1853, organized in 1859, and the first section of road completed in 1860.
- Emory, William H. Reminiscences of General William Hemsley Emory. 1800. 46 pages. Typescript. US Military Academy Library, West Point, NY.
- United States, and William H. Emory. Returns of the Fifth Regiment of Cavalry, Army of the United States (Colonel William H. Emory) for the Months of May, June, July, 1874. 1970. Size of sheets varies. Photocopy of records in the National archives. 6 sheets. 83 x 38 cm. fold. to 31 x 23 cm.
- Frémont, John Charles, William H. Emory, and J. W. Abert. Notes of Travel in California Comprising the Prominent Geographical, Agricultural, Geological and Mineralogical Features of the Country : Also, the Route from Fort Leavenworth in Missouri to San Diego in California, Including Parts of the Arkansas, Del Norte and Gila Rivers. New York: D. Appleton & Co, 1849.
- Jones, Anson, Anson Jones, and William H. Emory. Memoranda and Official Correspondence Relating to the Republic of Texas, Its History and Annexation; Including a Brief Autobiography of the Author. Chicago: Rio Grande Press, 1966. Paging irregular. A reprint of the 1859 ed. (New York, Appleton), together with a reprint of the 1848 ed. (30 p.) of the author's "Letters, relating to the history of annexation" (Galveston, Printed at the Civilian Office), and facsims. of the "Map of Texas and the countries adjacent," compiled by William H. Emory, 1844, of the author's speech Feb. 19, 1846, delivered in Austin when Texas became a state, and of a previously unpublished pref. which the author's wife, Mary Jones, wrote for the "Memoranda." 736 p. 3 facsims. (2 fold., incl. map), port. 24 cm.
- Mertz Library, The New York Botanical Garden, and Emory, William H. 1811–1887. Correspondence: Emory and John Torrey. n.d. <https://www.biodiversitylibrary.org/bibliography/61133>.
- Nicollet, J. N., John Charles Frémont, John James Abert, William H. Emory, and William James Stone. Hydrographical Basin of the Upper Mississippi River: From Astronomical and Barometrical Observations, Surveys and Information. St. Paul, Minn: Minnesota Historical Society, 1976. Title on case: A map: the hydrographical basin of the Mississippi River, 1843. Relief shown by hachures. "Reduced and compiled under the direction of Col. J.J. Abert ... by Lieut. W.H. Emory from the map published in 1842 and from other authorities in 1843. Published by order of the U.S. Senate. W.J. Stone, Sc. Mountains engraved by E.F. Woodward, Phila." "Printed from an original copy, 1976." 1 map; 90 × 76 cm., folded to 21 × 13 cm., in case 24 × 15 cm.
- United States, and William H. Emory. Correspondence between the War Department and Colonel Emory. [Washington]: [publisher not identified], 1872. 34 pages. At head of title: 42d Congress, 2d session. House of Representatives. Ex. doc. no. 209.
- United States, William H. Emory, James Hall, T. A. Conrad, C. C. Parry, and Arthur Schott. Geological Reports. [Washington]: [Nicholson], 1857. 174 pages, [21] plates : illustrations; 29 cm.
- United States, and William Hensley Emory. Map of Texas and Part of New Mexico. S.l: s.n, 1970. Relief shown by hachures. Number of stations listed with latitude and longitude given for each. Facsim. of 1857 ed. Scale 1:1,500,000. 1 map; 58 x 64 cm. Responsibility: compiled in the Bureau of Topograph Engrs. Chiefly for military purposes; Map of the Rio Del Norte section of the boundary between United States and Mexico under the direction of Major W.H. Emory.
- United States, John G. Parke, and William H. Emory. Report of Explorations for That Portion of a Railway Route Near the 32d Parallel of Latitude, Lying between Dona Ana, on the Rio Grande, and Pimas Villages, on the Gila. Washington, D.C.: Corps of Topographical Engineers, 1855. "House Document #129." "Route near the thirty-second parallel. Extract from Report of Lieutenant Colonel Emory of a military reconnaissance made in 1846 and 1847": p. 33–53.

== See also ==
- List of American Civil War generals (Union)
