= Nansen-Apollo (crater) =

Crater on the Moon

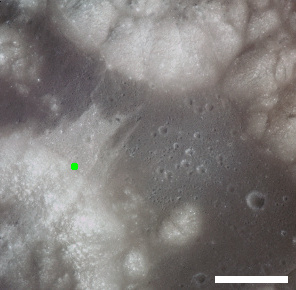
- Location of Nansen-Apollo crater in Taurus-Littrow Valley. South Massif is at lower left, North Massif is at top center, and Sculptured Hills are at upper right. Scale bar is 5 km
- Coordinates: 20.11°N 30.53°E
- Diameter: 860 m
- Eponym: Astronaut-named feature

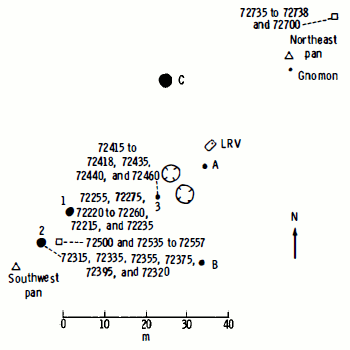
Planimetric map of Station 2

Nansen-Apollo is a feature on Earth's Moon, a crater in Taurus-Littrow valley, at the base of the South Massif. Astronauts Eugene Cernan and Harrison Schmitt visited it in 1972, on the Apollo 17 mission. The astronauts referred to it simply as Nansen during the mission. Geology Station 2 of the mission was located at Nansen. Nansen is located in the 'light mantle' which is almost certainly an avalanche deposit from the South Massif.

To the north of Nansen is Lara crater and Geology Station 3. To the northeast is Shorty and Geology Station 4. About 5 km to the east are Mackin and Hess craters.

The crater was named by the astronauts after Fridtjof Nansen, a Norwegian explorer.

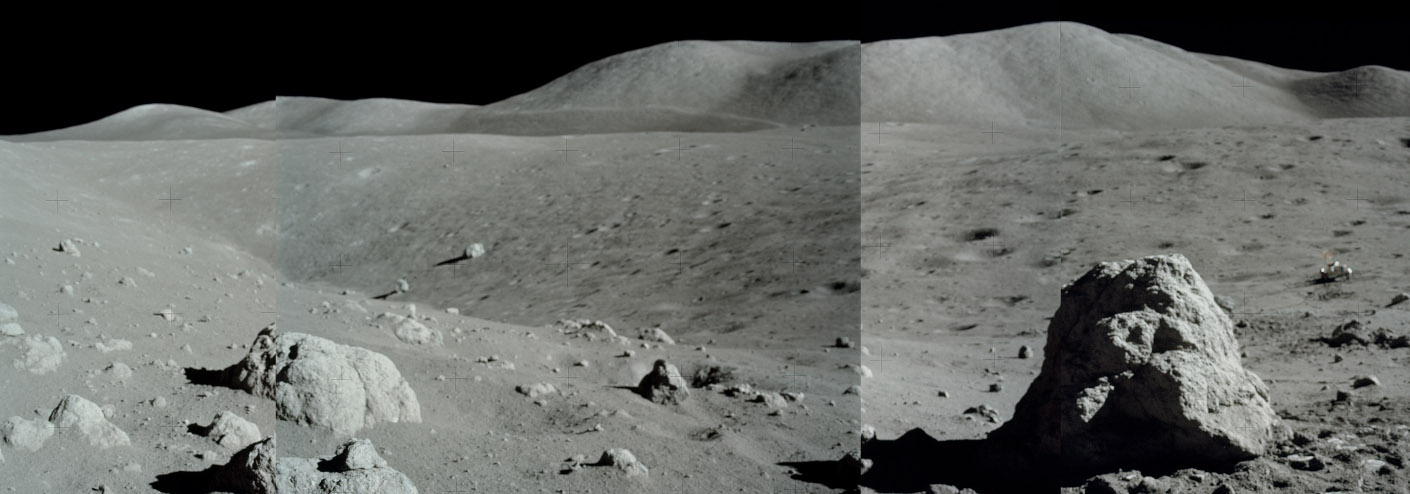
Nansen crater at the base of South Massif, facing north. Note the rover near the right edge for scale. The boulder in right foreground (boulder 2) was heavily sampled by the astronauts.

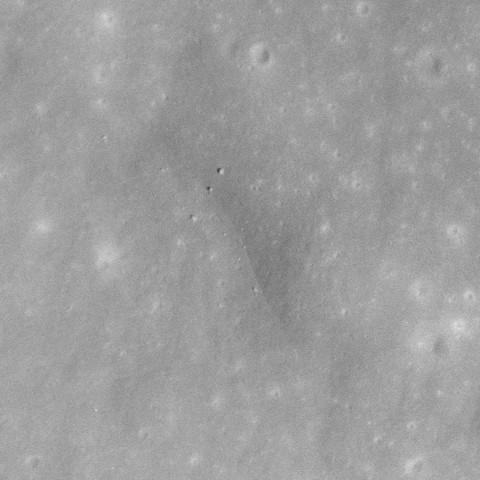
Apollo 17 panoramic camera image. Note the boulders near center which are visible in the ground-level image as well.

Sample 72435, collected at Station 2. This is a vesicular bluegray breccia.
