= Campbell Dallas Emory =

American Civil War officer

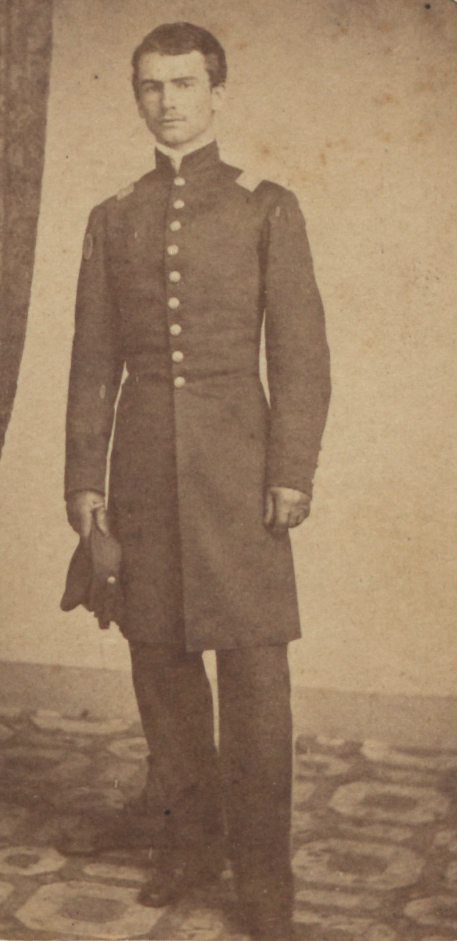
- Portrait of Emory
- Born: December 23, 1839; Philadelphia, Pennsylvania, U.S.
- Died: March 11, 1878 (aged 38); San Antonio, Texas, U.S.
- Burial place: Oak Hill Cemetery; Washington, D.C., U.S.
- Education: United States Military Academy
- Spouse: Clara Tilton (m. 1864)
- Children: 5
- Relatives: William H. Emory (father)
- Military career
- Allegiance: United States
- Units: 6th Infantry Regiment; 9th Infantry Regiment
- Conflicts: American Civil War

Campbell Dallas Emory (December 23, 1839 – March 11, 1878) was an officer in the American Civil War. He served as aide-de-camp to Major General George Meade.

== Early life ==
Campbell Dallas Emory, eldest son of Matilda Wilkins (née Bache) and Major General William H. Emory, was born on December 23, 1839, in Philadelphia, Pennsylvania. His great-great-grandfather was Benjamin Franklin. Like his father, Campbell Emory graduated from the United States Military Academy, West Point, on May 6, 1861. He graduated as a second lieutenant in the 6th United States Infantry Regiment, he transferred to the 9th United States Infantry Regiment; where he rose in rank throughout the American Civil War. From December 1863 to the end of the war, Capt. Emory served as the aide-de-camp to Major General George Meade.

== Personal life ==
On December 29, 1864, Campbell Dallas Emory married Clara Tilton, a daughter of Commander Edward Gibson Tilton, U.S. Navy in Washington, D.C. This union had five known children: Matilda, George Meade, Josephine, Clara and Elizabeth.

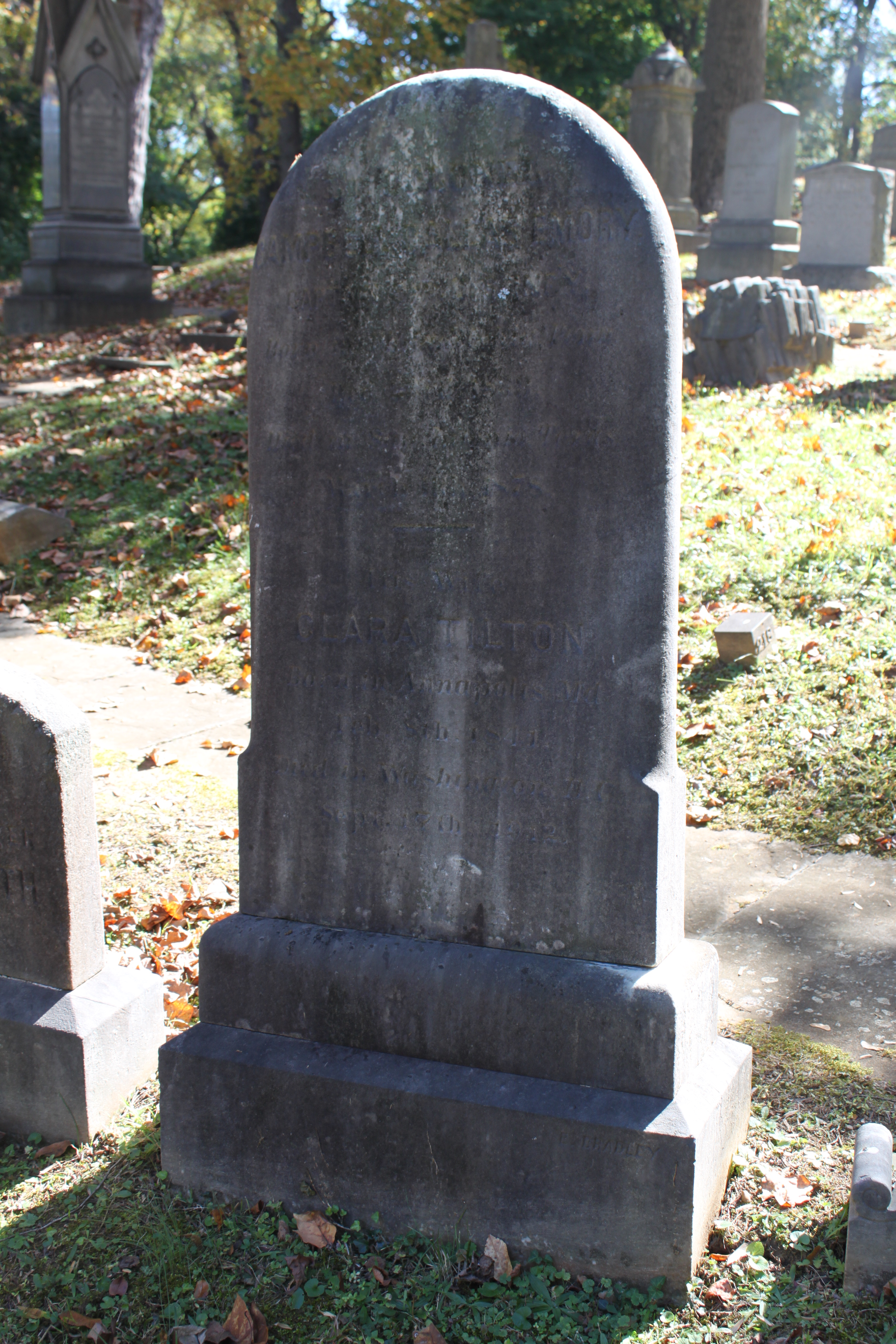
Grave of Emory at Oak Hill Cemetery

Lieut. Colonel Campbell Dallas Emory died on March 11, 1878, in San Antonio, Texas. He was buried at Oak Hill Cemetery in Washington, D.C.
