= TransDiv =

TransDiv is the authorized abbreviation or acronym used by the U.S. Navy during World War II for "transport division." The commander of a transport division was known as ComTransDiv (followed by the number of the division).
