= Lara (lunar crater) =

Crater on the Moon

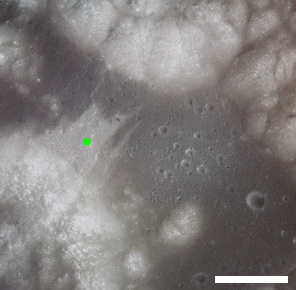
- Location of Lara crater in Taurus-Littrow Valley. South Massif is at lower left, North Massif is at top center, and Sculptured Hills are at upper right. Scale bar is 5 km
- Coordinates: 20.17°N 30.55°E
- Diameter: 620 m
- Eponym: Astronaut-named feature

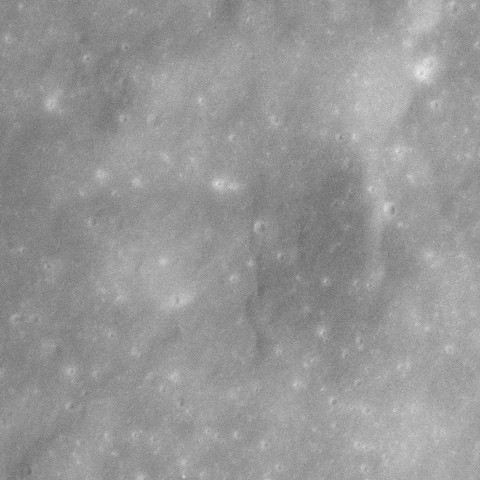
Apollo 17 panoramic camera image

Lara is a feature on Earth's Moon, a crater in Taurus-Littrow valley. Astronauts Eugene Cernan and Harrison Schmitt visited it in 1972, on the Apollo 17 mission, during EVA 2. Geology Station 3 of the mission is located on the northeast rim of Lara.

Lara is located in the 'light mantle' which is almost certainly an avalanche deposit from the South Massif. To the south of Lara is Nansen crater and Geology Station 2. To the northeast is Shorty crater and Geology Station 4.

The crater was named by the astronauts after the heroine of the novel Doctor Zhivago by Boris Pasternak.

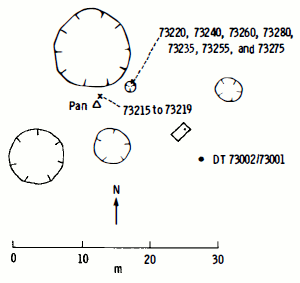
Planimetric map of the Station 3 on the northeast rim of Lara
