= Apollo 17 =

Sixth and most recent crewed Moon landing

- Gene Cernan salutes the U.S. flag, with the Apollo Lunar Module Challenger and Lunar Roving Vehicle in the background
- Mission type: Crewed lunar landing (J)
- Operator: NASA
- COSPAR ID: CSM: 1972-096A; LM: 1972-096C
- SATCAT no.: CSM: 6300; LM: 6307
- Mission duration: 12 days, 13 hours, 51 minutes, 59 seconds

Spacecraft properties
- Spacecraft: Apollo CSM-114; Apollo LM-12
- Manufacturer: CSM: North American Rockwell; LM: Grumman
- Launch mass: 48,609 kg (107,165 lb)
- Landing mass: 5,500 kg (12,120 lb)

Crew
- Crew size: 3
- Members: Eugene A. Cernan; Ronald E. Evans; Harrison H. Schmitt
- Callsign: CSM: America; Lunar Module: Challenger
- EVAs: 1 in cislunar space
- EVA duration: 1 hour, 5 minutes, 44 seconds (spacewalk to retrieve film cassettes)

Start of mission
- Launch date: December 7, 1972, 05:33:00 UTC (12:33 am EST)
- Rocket: Saturn V SA-512
- Launch site: Kennedy, LC-39A

End of mission
- Recovered by: USS Ticonderoga
- Landing date: December 19, 1972, 19:54:58 UTC
- Landing site: South Pacific Ocean (17.88°S 166.11°W)

Lunar orbiter
- Spacecraft component: Command and service module
- Orbital insertion: December 10, 1972, 19:53:55 UTC
- Orbital departure: December 16, 1972, 23:35:09 UTC
- Orbits: 75

Lunar lander
- Spacecraft component: Lunar Module
- Landing date: December 11, 1972, 19:54:58 UTC
- Return launch: December 14, 1972, 22:54:37 UTC
- Landing site: Taurus–Littrow; 20.1908°N 30.7717°E
- Sample mass: 115 kg (254 lb)
- Surface EVAs: 3
- EVA duration: 22 hours, 3 minutes, 57 seconds; 1st: 7 hours, 11 minutes, 53 seconds; 2nd: 7 hours, 36 minutes, 56 seconds; 3rd: 7 hours, 15 minutes, 8 seconds

Lunar rover
- Distance driven: 35.7 km (22.2 mi)
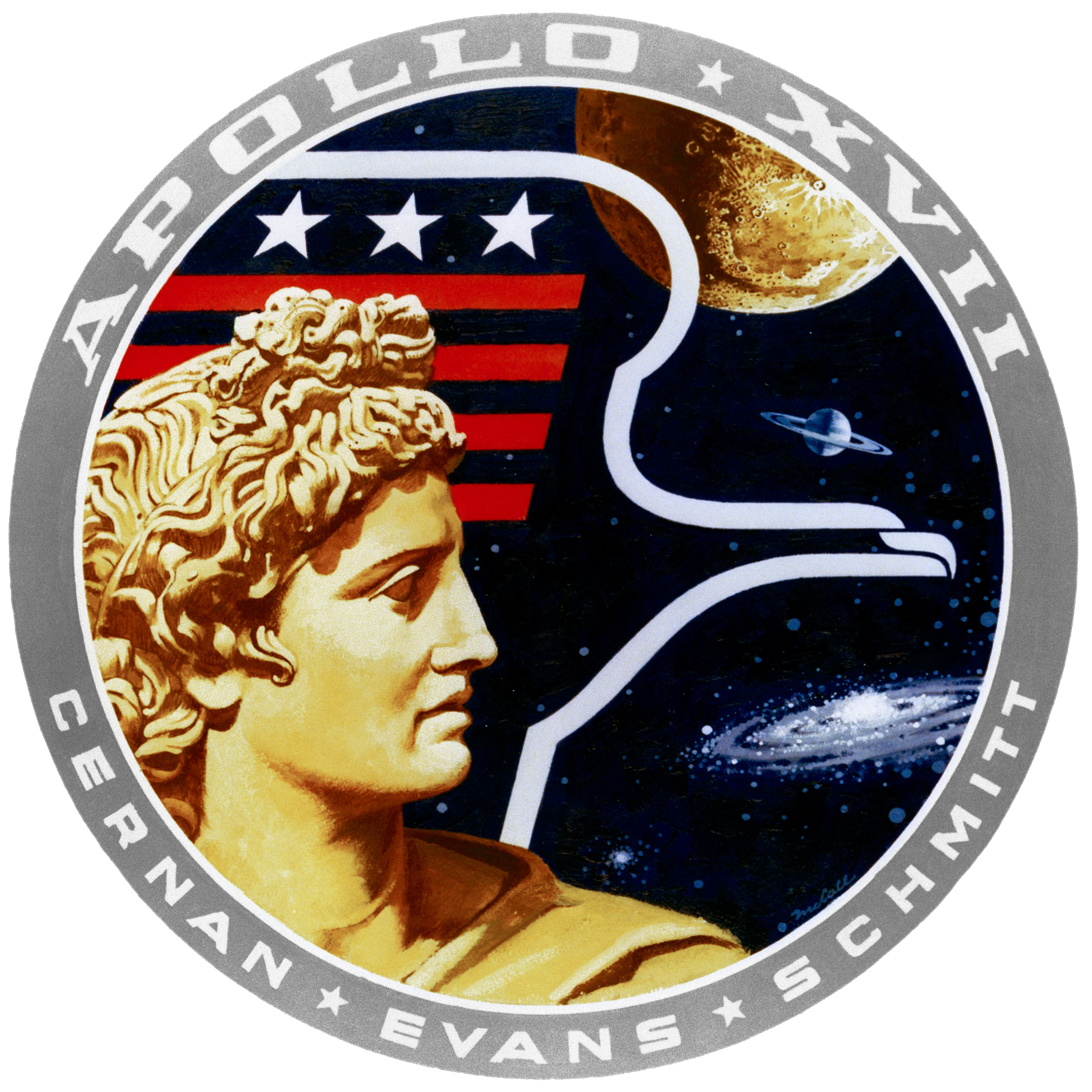
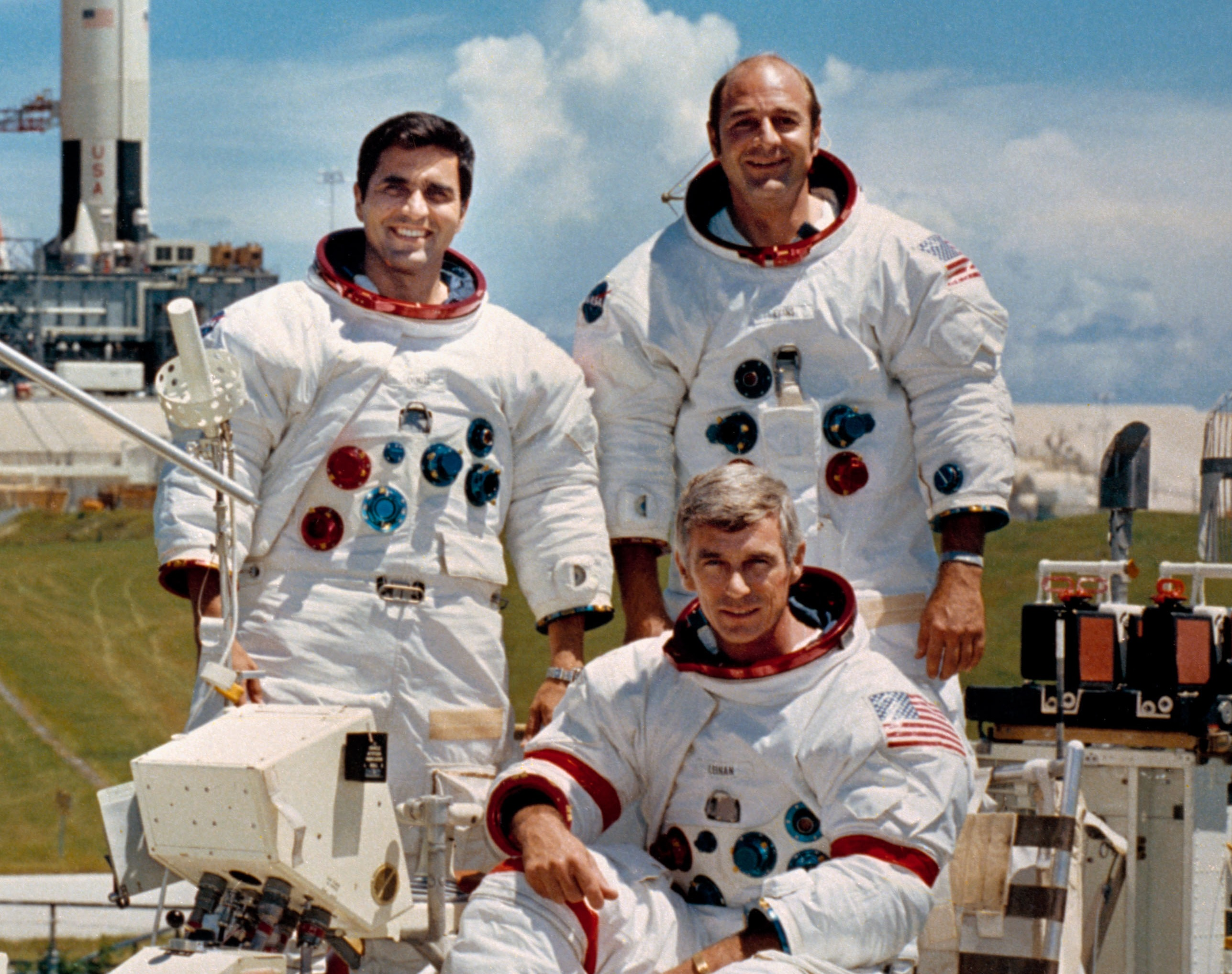
- Left to right: Schmitt, Cernan (seated), Evans Apollo program

Apollo 17 (December 7–19, 1972) was the eleventh and final crewed mission of NASA's Apollo program, the sixth and most recent time humans have set foot on the Moon. Commander Gene Cernan and Lunar Module Pilot Harrison Schmitt walked on the Moon, while Command Module Pilot Ronald Evans orbited above. Schmitt was the only professional geologist to land on the Moon; he was selected in place of Joe Engle, as NASA had been under pressure to send a scientist to the Moon. The mission's heavy emphasis on science meant the inclusion of a number of new experiments, including a biological experiment containing five mice that stayed in orbit with Evans.

Mission planners had two primary goals in deciding on the landing site: to sample lunar highland material older than that at Mare Imbrium and to investigate the possibility of relatively recent volcanic activity. They therefore selected Taurus–Littrow, where formations that had been viewed and pictured from lunar orbit were thought to be volcanic in nature. Since all three crew members had backed up previous Apollo lunar missions, they were familiar with the Apollo spacecraft and had more time for geology training.

Launched at 12:33 a.m. Eastern Standard Time (EST) on December 7, 1972, following the only launchpad delay in the Apollo program, which was caused by a hardware problem, Apollo 17 was a "J-type" mission that included three days on the lunar surface, expanded scientific capability, and the use of the third Lunar Roving Vehicle (LRV). Cernan and Schmitt landed in the Taurus–Littrow valley, completed three moonwalks, took lunar samples and deployed scientific instruments. Orange soil was discovered at Shorty crater; it proved to be volcanic in origin, although from early in the Moon's history. Evans remained in lunar orbit in the command and service module, taking scientific measurements and photographs. The spacecraft returned to Earth on December 19. It was the last human flight beyond low Earth orbit until the Artemis II lunar flyby in April 2026.

The mission broke several records for crewed spaceflight, including the longest crewed lunar landing mission (12 days, 14 hours), greatest distance from a spacecraft during an extravehicular activity of any type (7.6 kilometers or 4.7 miles), longest time on the lunar surface (75 hours), longest total duration of lunar-surface extravehicular activities (22 hours, 4 minutes), largest lunar-sample return (approximately 115 kg or 254 lb), longest time in lunar orbit (6 days, 4 hours), and greatest number of lunar orbits (75).

== Crew and key Mission Control personnel ==
Position	Astronaut
Commander	Eugene A. Cernan; Third and last spaceflight
Command Module Pilot (CMP)	Ronald E. Evans Jr. Only spaceflight
Lunar Module Pilot (LMP)	Harrison "Jack" H. Schmitt; Only spaceflight

In 1969, NASA announced that the backup crew of Apollo 14 would be Gene Cernan, Ronald Evans, and former X-15 pilot Joe Engle. This put them in line to be the prime crew of Apollo 17, because the Apollo program's crew rotation generally meant that a backup crew would fly as prime crew three missions later. Harrison Schmitt, who was a professional geologist as well as an astronaut, in 1971 served on the backup crew of Apollo 15, and thus, because of the rotation, would have been due to fly as lunar module pilot on Apollo 18.

In September 1970, the plan to launch Apollo 18 was cancelled. The scientific community pressed NASA to assign a geologist, rather than a pilot with non-professional geological training, to an Apollo landing. NASA subsequently assigned Schmitt to Apollo 17 as the lunar module pilot. After that, NASA's director of flight crew operations, Deke Slayton, was left with the question of who would fill the two other Apollo 17 slots: the rest of the Apollo 15 backup crew (Dick Gordon and Vance Brand), or Cernan and Evans from the Apollo 14 backup crew. Slayton ultimately chose Cernan and Evans. Support at NASA for assigning Cernan was not unanimous. Cernan had crashed a Bell 47G helicopter into the Indian River near Cape Kennedy during a training exercise in January 1971; the accident was later attributed to pilot error, as Cernan had misjudged his altitude before crashing into the water. Jim McDivitt, who was manager of the Apollo Spacecraft Program Office at the time, objected to Cernan's selection because of this accident, but Slayton dismissed the concern. After Cernan was offered command of the mission, he advocated for Engle to fly with him on the mission, but it was made clear to him that Schmitt would be assigned instead, with or without Cernan, so he acquiesced. The prime crew of Apollo 17 was publicly announced on August 13, 1971.

When assigned to Apollo 17, Cernan was a 38-year-old captain in the United States Navy; he had been selected in the third group of astronauts in 1963, and flown as pilot of Gemini 9A in 1966 and as lunar module pilot of Apollo 10 in 1969 before he served on Apollo 14's backup crew. Evans, 39 years old when assigned to Apollo 17, had been selected as part of the fifth group of astronauts in 1966, and had been a lieutenant commander in the United States Navy. Schmitt, a civilian, was 37 years old when assigned Apollo 17, had a doctorate in geology from Harvard University, and had been selected in the fourth group of astronauts in 1965. Both Evans and Schmitt were making their first spaceflights.

Apollo 17: On The Shoulders of Giants (1973) Official NASA information film reel.

For the backup crews of Apollo 16 and 17, the final Apollo lunar missions, NASA selected astronauts who had already flown Apollo lunar missions, to take advantage of their experience, and avoid investing time and money in training rookies who would be unlikely to ever fly an Apollo mission. The original backup crew for Apollo 17, announced at the same time as the prime crew, was the crew of Apollo 15: David Scott as commander, Alfred Worden as CMP and James Irwin as LMP, but in May 1972 they were removed from the backup crew because of their roles in the Apollo 15 postal covers incident. They were replaced with the landing crew of Apollo 16: John W. Young as backup crew commander, Charles Duke as LMP, and Apollo 14's CMP, Stuart Roosa. Originally, Apollo 16's CMP, Ken Mattingly, was to be assigned along with his crewmates, but he declined so he could spend more time with his family, his son having just been born, and instead took an assignment to the Space Shuttle program. Roosa had also served as backup CMP for Apollo 16.

For the Apollo program, in addition to the prime and backup crews that had been used in the Mercury and Gemini programs, NASA assigned a third crew of astronauts, known as the support crew. Their role was to provide any assistance in preparing for the missions that the missions director assigned then. Preparations took place in meetings at facilities across the US and sometimes needed a member of the flight crew to attend them. Because McDivitt was concerned that problems could be created if a prime or backup crew member was unable to attend a meeting, Slayton created the support crews to ensure that someone would be able to attend in their stead. Usually low in seniority, they also assembled the mission's rules, flight plan and checklists, and kept them updated; for Apollo 17, they were Robert F. Overmyer, Robert A. Parker and C. Gordon Fullerton.

Flight directors were Gerry Griffin, first shift, Gene Kranz and Neil B. Hutchinson, second shift, and Pete Frank and Charles R. Lewis, third shift. According to Kranz, flight directors during the program Apollo had a one-sentence job description, "The flight director may take any actions necessary for crew safety and mission success." Capsule communicators (CAPCOMs) were Fullerton, Parker, Young, Duke, Mattingly, Roosa, Alan Shepard and Joseph P. Allen.

== Mission insignia and call signs ==
The insignia's most prominent feature is an image of the Greek sun god Apollo backdropped by a rendering of an American eagle, the red bars on the eagle mirroring those on the U.S. flag. Three white stars above the red bars represent the three crewmembers of the mission. The background includes the Moon, the planet Saturn, and a galaxy or nebula. The wing of the eagle partially overlays the Moon, suggesting humanity's established presence there.

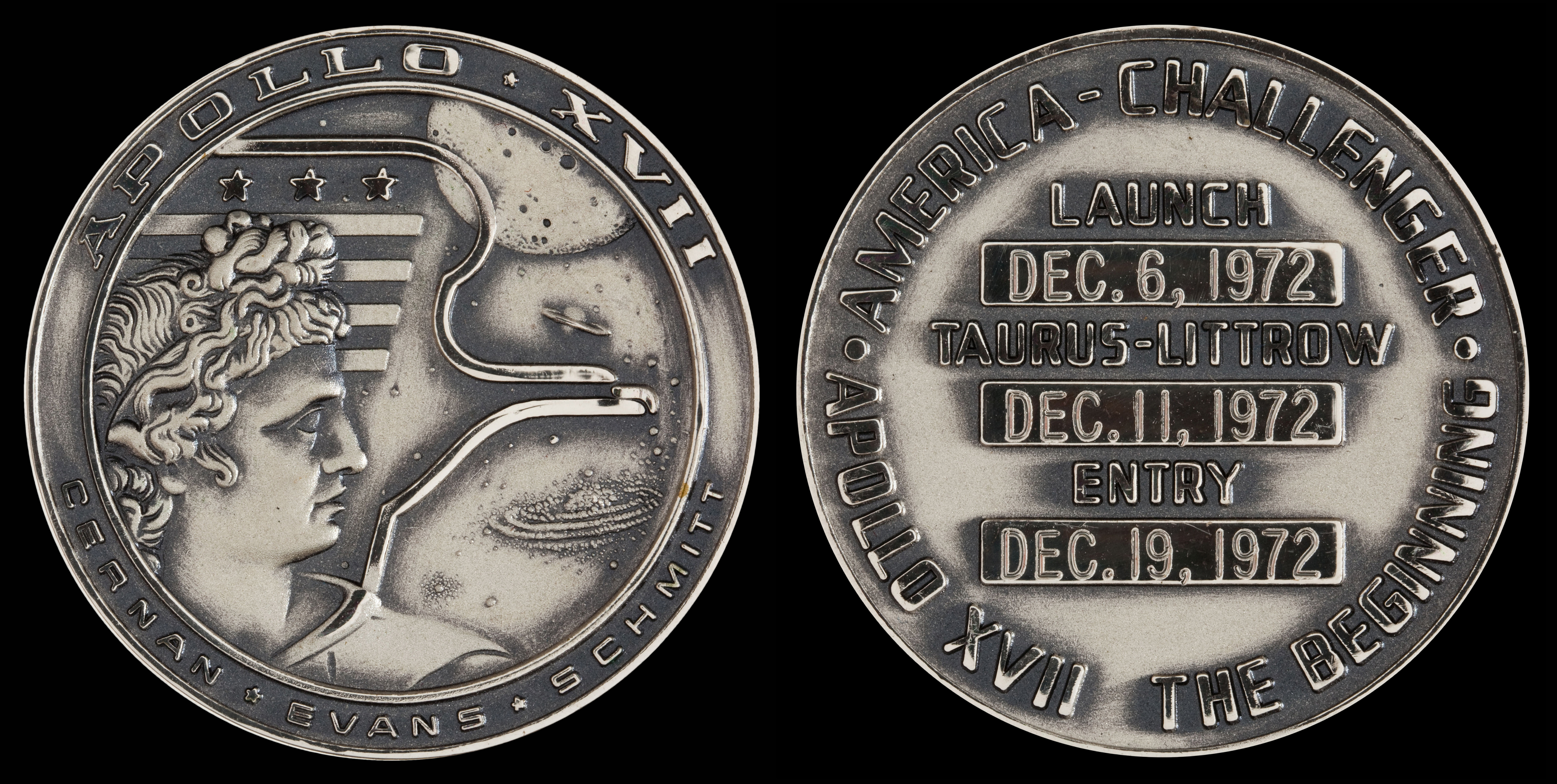
Apollo 17 space-flown silver Robbins medallion

The insignia includes, along with the colors of the U.S. flag (red, white, and blue), the color gold, representative of a "golden age" of spaceflight that was to begin with Apollo 17. The image of Apollo in the mission insignia is a rendering of the Apollo Belvedere sculpture in the Vatican Museums. It looks forward into the future, towards the celestial objects shown in the insignia beyond the Moon. These represent humanity's goals, and the image symbolizes human intelligence, wisdom and ambition. The insignia was designed by artist Robert McCall, based on ideas from the crew.

In deciding the call signs for the command module (CM) and Lunar Module (LM), the crew wished to pay tribute to the American public for their support of the Apollo program, and to the mission, and wanted names with a tradition within American history. The CM was given the call sign "America". According to Cernan, this evoked the 19th century sailing ships which were given that name, and was a thank-you to the people of the United States. The crew selected the name "Challenger" for the LM in lieu of an alternative, "Heritage". Cernan stated that the selected name "just seemed to describe more of what the future for America really held, and that was a challenge". After Schmitt stepped onto the Moon from Challenger, he stated, "I think the next generation ought to accept this as a challenge. Let's see them leave footprints like these."

== Planning and training ==
=== Scheduling and landing site selection ===
Prior to the cancellation of Apollo 18 through 20, Apollo 17 was slated to launch in September 1971 as part of NASA's tentative launch schedule set forth in 1969. The in-flight abort of Apollo 13 and the resulting modifications to the Apollo spacecraft delayed subsequent missions. Following the cancellation of Apollo 20 in early 1970, NASA decided there would be no more than two Apollo missions per year. Part of the reason Apollo 17 was scheduled for December 1972 was to make it fall after the presidential election in November, ensuring that if there was a disaster, it would have no effect on President Richard Nixon's re-election campaign. Nixon had been deeply concerned about the Apollo 13 astronauts, and, fearing another mission in crisis as he ran for re-election, initially decided to omit the funds for Apollo 17 from the budget; he was persuaded to accept a December 1972 date for the mission.

Like Apollo 15 and 16, Apollo 17 was slated to be a "J-mission", an Apollo mission type that featured lunar surface stays of three days, higher scientific capability, and the usage of the Lunar Roving Vehicle. Since Apollo 17 was to be the final lunar landing of the Apollo program, high-priority landing sites that had not been visited previously were given consideration for potential exploration. Some sites were rejected at earlier stages. For instance, a landing in the crater Copernicus was rejected because Apollo 12 had already obtained samples from that impact, and three other Apollo expeditions had already visited the vicinity of Mare Imbrium, near the rim of which Copernicus is located. The lunar highlands near the crater Tycho were rejected because of the rough terrain that the astronauts would encounter there. A site on the lunar far side in the crater Tsiolkovskiy was rejected due to technical considerations and the operational costs of maintaining communication with Earth during surface operations. Lastly, a landing in a region southwest of Mare Crisium was rejected on the grounds that a Soviet spacecraft could easily access the site and retrieve samples; Luna 20 ultimately did so shortly after the Apollo 17 site selection was made. Schmitt advocated for a landing on the far side of the Moon until told by Director of Flight Operations Christopher C. Kraft that it would not happen as NASA lacked the funds for the necessary communications satellites.

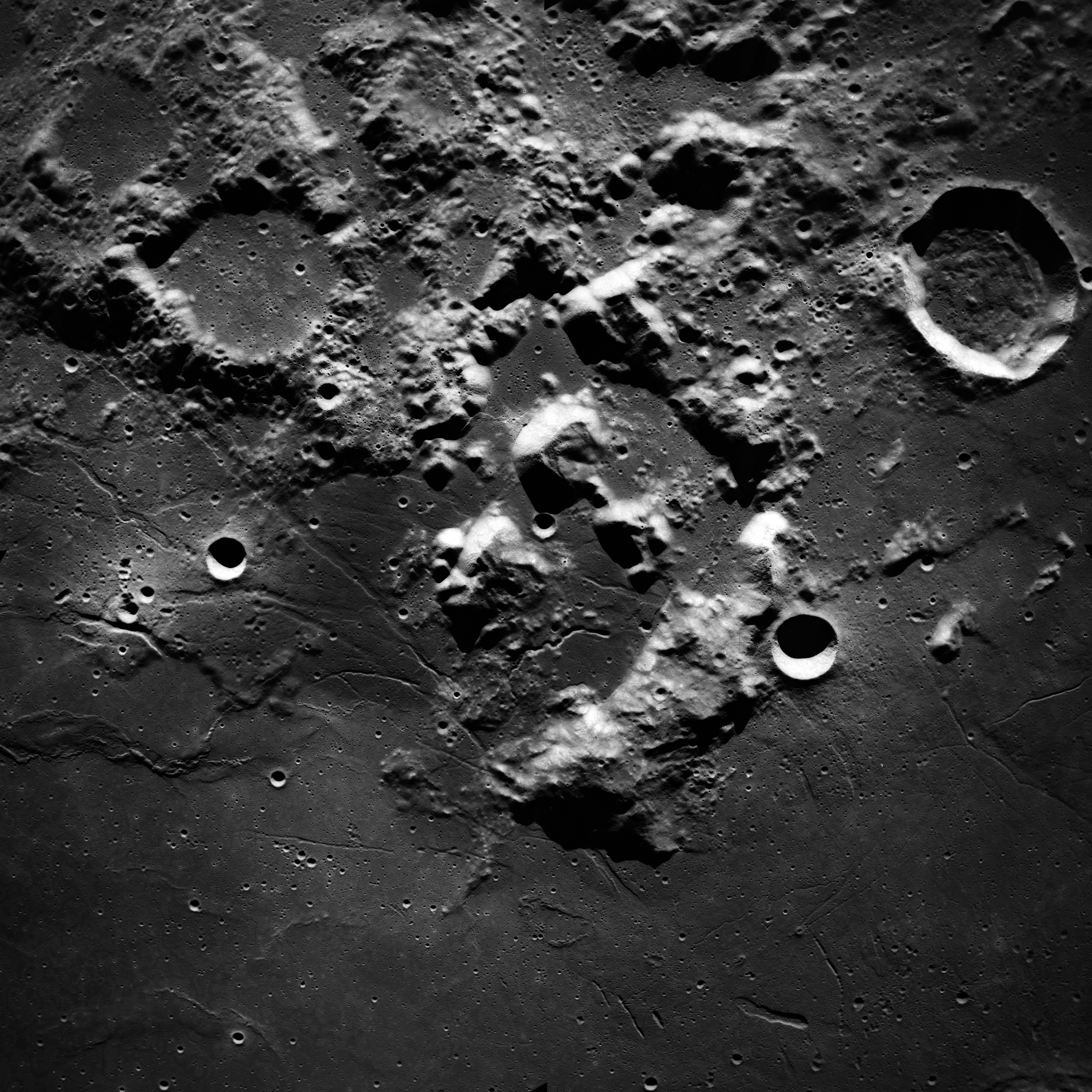
Landing site and surrounding area, as imaged from the Apollo 17 command module, 1972

The three sites that made the final consideration for Apollo 17 were Alphonsus crater, Gassendi crater, and the Taurus–Littrow valley. In making the final landing site decision, mission planners considered the primary objectives for Apollo 17: obtaining old highlands material a substantial distance from Mare Imbrium, sampling material from young volcanic activity (i.e., less than three billion years), and having minimal ground overlap with the orbital ground tracks of Apollo 15 and Apollo 16 to maximize the amount of new data obtained. A significant reason for the selection of Taurus–Littrow was that Apollo 15's CMP, Al Worden, had overflown the site and observed features he described as likely volcanic in nature.

Gassendi was eliminated because NASA felt that its central peak would be difficult to reach due to the roughness of the local terrain, and, though Alphonsus might be easier operationally than Taurus–Littrow, it was of lesser scientific interest. At Taurus–Littrow, it was believed that the crew would be able to obtain samples of old highland material from the remnants of a landslide event that occurred on the south wall of the valley and the possibility of relatively young, explosive volcanic activity in the area. Although the valley is similar to the landing site of Apollo 15 in that it is on the border of a lunar mare, the advantages of Taurus–Littrow were believed to outweigh the drawbacks. The Apollo Site Selection Board, a committee of NASA personnel and scientists charged with setting out scientific objectives of the Apollo landing missions and selecting landing sites for them, unanimously recommended Taurus–Littrow at its final meeting in February 1972. Upon that recommendation, NASA selected Taurus–Littrow as the landing site for Apollo 17.

=== Training ===
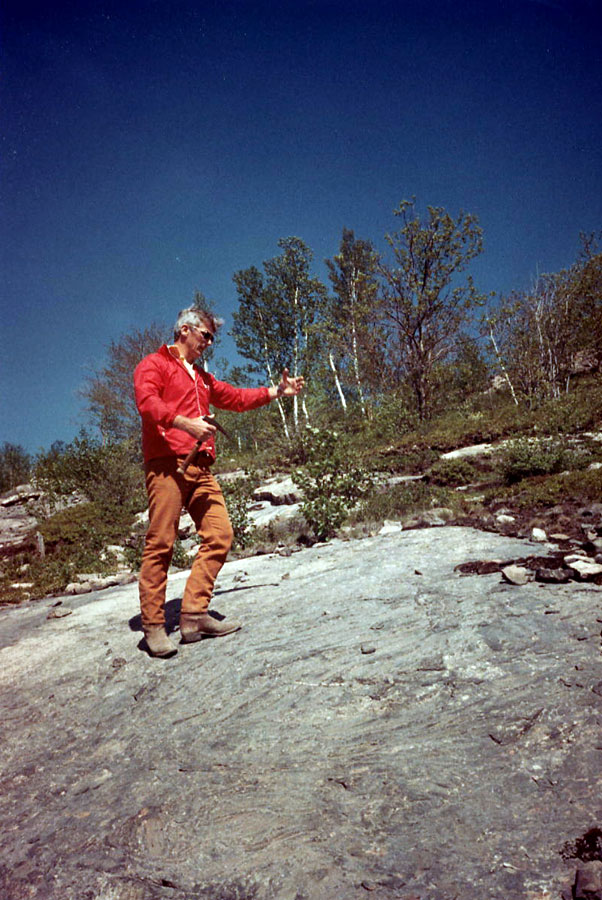
Gene Cernan participates in geology training in Sudbury, Ontario, in May 1972

As with previous lunar landings, the Apollo 17 astronauts undertook an extensive training program that included learning to collect samples on the surface, usage of the spacesuits, navigation in the Lunar Roving Vehicle, field geology training, survival training, splashdown and recovery training, and equipment training. The geology field trips were conducted as much as possible as if the astronauts were on the Moon: they would be provided with aerial images and maps, and briefed on features of the site and a suggested routing. The following day, they would follow the route, and have tasks and observations to be done at each of the stops.

The geology field trips began with one to Big Bend National Park in Texas in October 1971. The early ones were not specifically tailored to prepare the astronauts for Taurus–Littrow, which was not selected until February 1972, but by June, the astronauts were going on field trips to sites specifically selected to prepare for Apollo 17's landing site. Both Cernan and Schmitt had served on backup crews for Apollo landing missions, and were familiar with many of the procedures. Their trainers, such as Gordon Swann, feared that Cernan would defer to Schmitt as a professional geologist on matters within his field. Cernan also had to adjust for the loss of Engle, with whom he had trained for Apollo 14. In spite of these issues, Cernan and Schmitt worked well together as a team, and Cernan became adept at describing what he was seeing on geology field trips, and working independently of Schmitt when necessary.

The landing crew aimed for a division of labor so that, when they arrived in a new area, Cernan would perform tasks such as adjusting the antenna on the Lunar Roving Vehicle so as to transmit to Earth while Schmitt gave a report on the geological aspects of the site. The scientists in the geology "backroom" relied on Schmitt's reports to adjust the tasks planned for that site, which would be transmitted to the CapCom and then to Cernan and Schmitt. According to William R. Muehlberger, one of the scientists who trained the astronauts, "In effect [Schmitt] was running the mission from the Moon. But we set it up this way. All of those within the geological world certainly knew it, and I had a sneaking hunch that the top brass knew it too, but this is a practical way out, and they didn't object."

Also participating in some of the geology field trips were the commander and lunar module pilot of the backup crew. The initial field trips took place before the Apollo 15 astronauts were assigned as the backup crew for Apollo 17 in February 1972. Either one or both of Scott and Irwin of Apollo 15 took part in four field trips, though both were present together for only two of them. After they were removed from the backup crew, the new backup commander and LMP, Young and Duke, took part in the final four field trips. On field trips, the backup crew would follow half an hour after the prime crew, performing identical tasks, and have their own simulated CapCom and Mission Control guiding them. The Apollo 17 astronauts had fourteen field trips—the Apollo 11 crew had only one.

Evans did not go on the geology field trips, having his own set of trainers—by this time, geology training for the CMP was well-established. He would fly with a NASA geologist/pilot, Dick Laidley, over geologic features, with part of the exercise conducted at 40,000 feet (12,000 m), and part at 1,000 feet (300 m) to 5,000 feet (1,500 m). The higher altitude was equivalent to what could be seen from the planned lunar orbit of about 60 nmi with binoculars. Evans would be briefed for several hours before each exercise, and given study guides; afterwards, there would be debriefing and evaluation. Evans was trained in lunar geology by Farouk El-Baz late in the training cycle; this continued until close to launch. The CMP was given information regarding the lunar features he would overfly in the CSM and which he was expected to photograph.

== Mission hardware and experiments ==
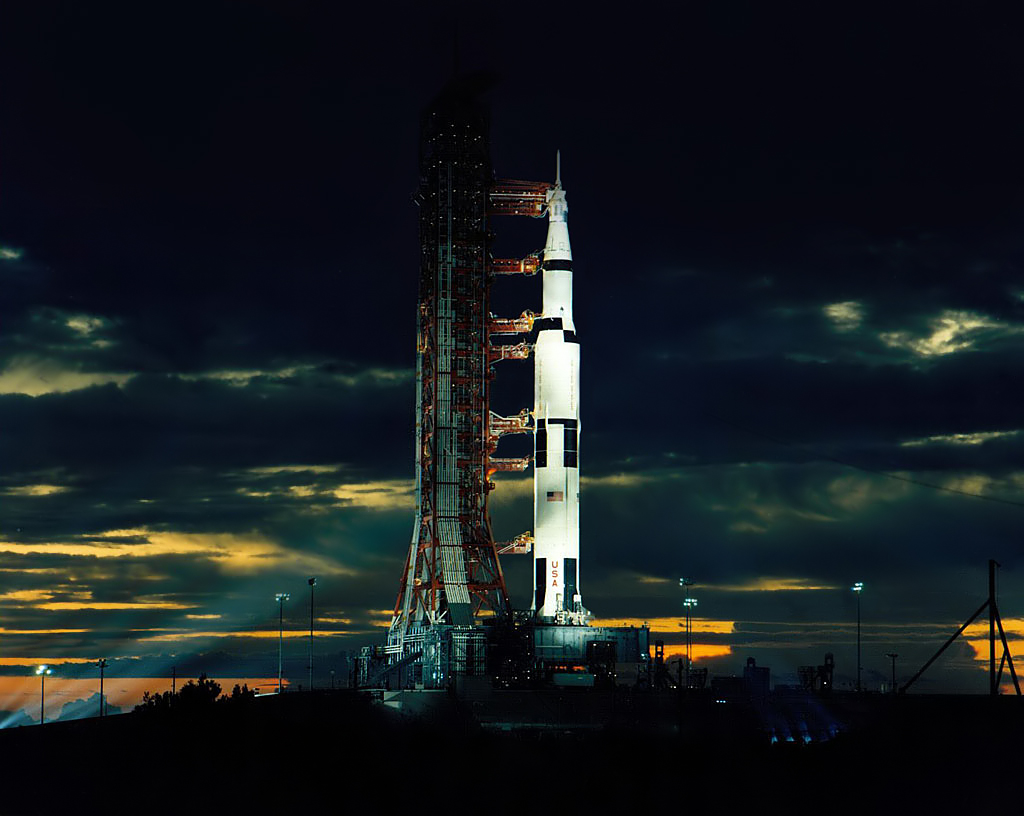
SA-512, Apollo 17's Saturn V rocket, on the launchpad awaiting liftoff, November 1972

=== Spacecraft and launch vehicle ===
The Apollo 17 spacecraft comprised CSM-114 (consisting of Command Module 114 (CM-114) and Service Module 114 (SM-114)); Lunar Module 12 (LM-12); a Spacecraft-Lunar Module Adapter (SLA) numbered SLA-21; and a Launch Escape System (LES). The LES contained a rocket motor that would propel the CM to safety in the event of an aborted mission in the moments after launch, while the SLA housed the LM during the launch and early part of the flight. The LES was jettisoned after the launch vehicle ascended to the point that it was not needed, while the SLA was left atop the S-IVB third stage of the rocket after the CSM and LM separated from it.

The launch vehicle, SA-512, was one of fifteen Saturn V rockets built, and was the twelfth to fly. With a weight at launch of 6,529,784 pounds (2,961,860 kg) (116,269 pounds (52,739 kg) of which was attributable to the spacecraft), Apollo 17's vehicle was slightly lighter than Apollo 16, but heavier than every other crewed Apollo mission.

==== Preparation and assembly ====
The first piece of the launch vehicle to arrive at Kennedy Space Center was the S-II second stage, on October 27, 1970; it was followed by the S-IVB on December 21; the S-IC first stage did not arrive until May 11, 1972, followed by the Instrument Unit on June 7. By then, LM-12 had arrived, the ascent stage on June 16, 1971, and the descent stage the following day; they were not mated until May 18, 1972. CM-114, SM-114 and SLA-21 all arrived on March 24, 1972. The rover reached Kennedy Space Center on June 2, 1972.

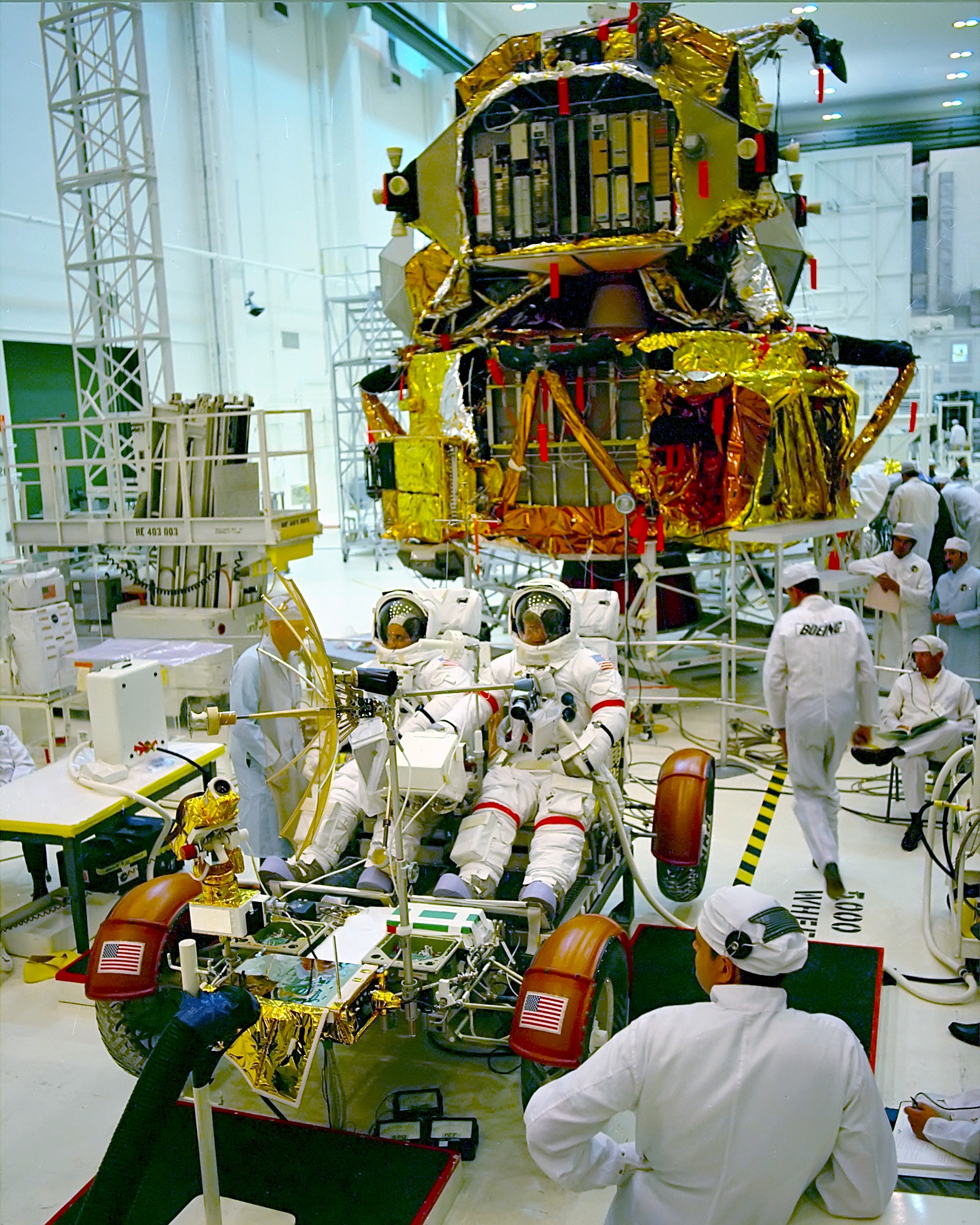
Cernan (seated, right) and Schmitt in the training Lunar Roving Vehicle, with the mockup Lunar Module in the background, August 1972

The CM and the service module (SM) were mated on March 28, 1972, and the testing of the spacecraft began that month. The CSM was placed in a vacuum chamber at Kennedy Space Center, and the testing was conducted under those conditions. The LM was also placed in a vacuum chamber; both the prime and the backup crews participated in testing the CSM and LM. During the testing, it was discovered that the LM's rendezvous radar assembly had received too much voltage during earlier tests; it was replaced by the manufacturer, Grumman. The LM's landing radar also malfunctioned intermittently and was also replaced. The front and rear steering motors of the Lunar Roving Vehicle (LRV) also had to be replaced, and it required several modifications. Following the July 1972 removal from the vacuum chamber, the LM's landing gear was installed, and it, the CSM and the SLA were mated to each other. The combined craft was moved into the Vehicle Assembly Building in August for further testing, after which it was mounted on the launch vehicle. After completing testing, including a simulated mission, the LRV was placed in the LM on August 13.

Erection of the stages of the launch vehicle began on May 15, 1972, in High Bay 3 of the Vehicle Assembly Building, and was completed on June 27. Since the launch vehicles for Skylab 1 and Skylab 2 were being processed in that building at the same time, this marked the first time NASA had three launch vehicles there since the height of the Apollo program in 1969. After the spacecraft was mounted on the launch vehicle on August 24, it was rolled out to Pad 39-A on August 28. Although this was not the final time a Saturn V would fly (another would lift Skylab to orbit), area residents reacted as though it was, and 5,000 of them watched the rollout, during which the prime crew joined the operating crew from Bendix atop the crawler.

At Pad 39-A, testing continued, and the CSM was electrically mated to the launch vehicle on October 11, 1972. Testing concluded with the countdown demonstration tests, accomplished on November 20 and 21. The countdown to launch began at 7:53 a.m. (12:53 UTC) on December 5, 1972.

=== Lunar surface science ===
==== ALSEP ====
The Apollo Lunar Surface Experiments Package was a suite of nuclear-powered experiments, flown on each landing mission after Apollo 11. This equipment was to be emplaced by the astronauts to continue functioning after the astronauts returned to Earth. For Apollo 17, the ALSEP experiments were a Heat Flow Experiment (HFE), to measure the rate of heat flow from the interior of the Moon, a Lunar Surface Gravimeter (LSG), to measure alterations in the lunar gravity field at the site, a Lunar Atmospheric Composition Experiment (LACE), to investigate what the lunar atmosphere is made up of, a Lunar Seismic Profiling Experiment (LSPE), to detect nearby seismic activity, and a Lunar Ejecta and Meteorites Experiment (LEME), to measure the velocity and energy of dust particles. Of these, only the HFE had been flown before; the others were new.

The HFE had been flown on the aborted Apollo 13 mission, as well as on Apollo 15 and 16, but placed successfully only on Apollo 15, and unexpected results from that device made scientists anxious for a second successful emplacement. It was successfully deployed on Apollo 17. The lunar gravimeter was intended to detect gravity waves, which would provide support for Albert Einstein's general theory of relativity; it ultimately failed to function as intended. The LACE was a surface-deployed module that used a mass spectrometer to analyze the Moon's atmosphere. On previous missions, the Cold Cathode Gauge experiment had measured the quantity of atmospheric particles, but the LACE determined which gases were present: principally neon, helium and hydrogen. The LSPE was a seismic-detecting device that used geophones, which would detect explosives to be set off by ground command once the astronauts left the Moon. When operating, it could only send useful data to Earth in high bit rate, meaning that no other ALSEP experiment could send data then, and limiting its operating time. It was turned on to detect the liftoff of the ascent stage, as well as use of the explosives packages, and the ascent stage's impact, and thereafter about once a week, as well as for some 100 hour periods. The LEME had a set of detectors to measure the characteristics of the dust particles it sought. It was hoped that the LEME would detect dust impacting the Moon from elsewhere, such as from comets or interstellar space, but analysis showed that it primarily detected dust moving at slow speeds across the lunar surface.

All powered ALSEP experiments that remained active were deactivated on September 30, 1977, principally because of budgetary constraints.

==== Other lunar-surface science ====
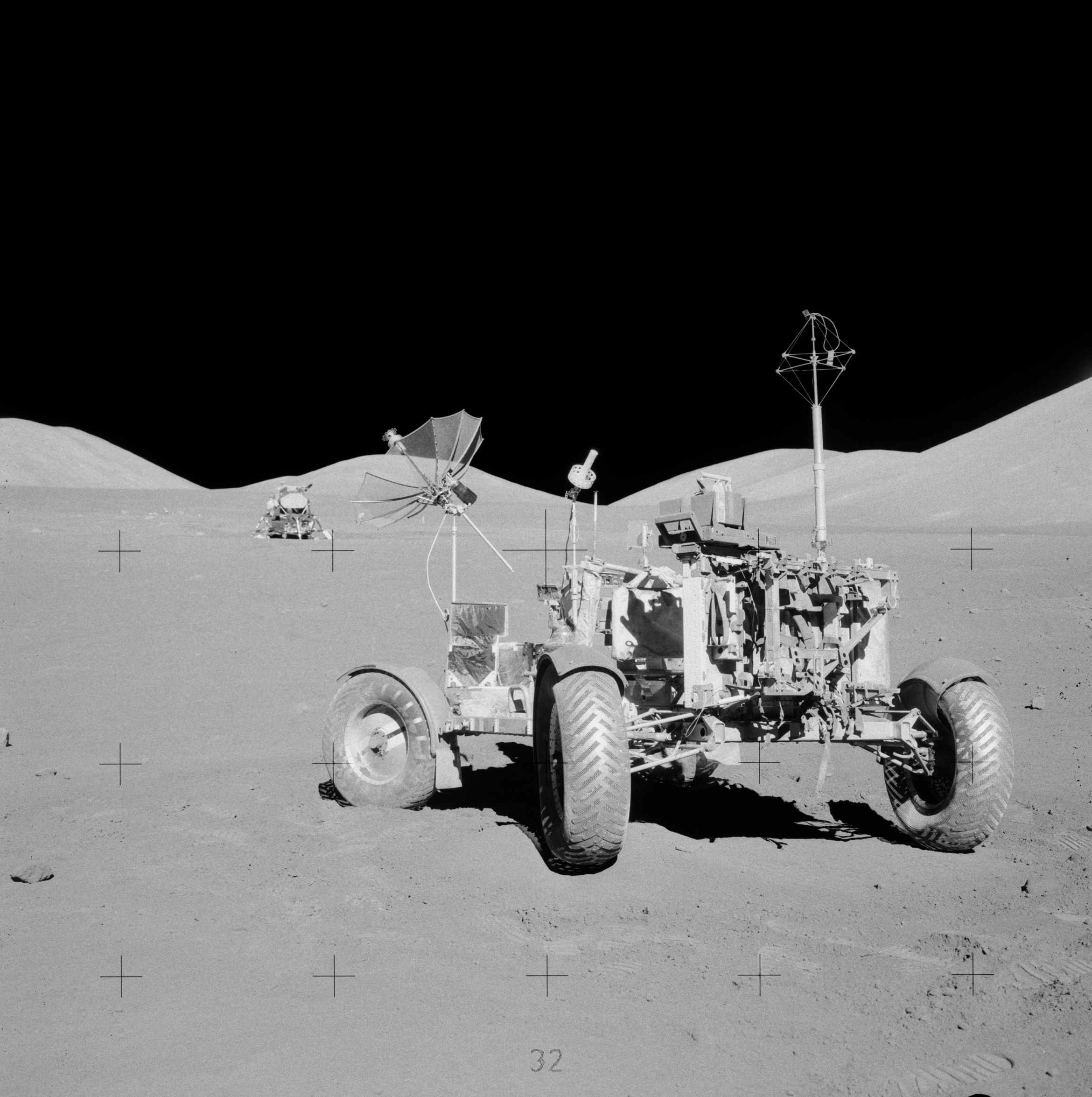
Apollo 17's Lunar Roving Vehicle. The Surface Electrical Properties (SEP) experiment receiver is the antenna on the right-rear of the vehicle

Like Apollo 15 and 16, Apollo 17 carried a Lunar Roving Vehicle. In addition to being used by the astronauts for transport from station to station on the mission's three moonwalks, the LRV was used to transport the astronauts' tools, communications equipment, and the lunar samples they gathered. The Apollo 17 LRV was also used to carry some of the scientific instruments, such as the Traverse Gravimeter Experiment (TGE) and Surface Electrical Properties (SEP) experiment. The Apollo 17 LRV traveled a cumulative distance of approximately 35.7 km (22.2 mi; 19.3 nmi) in a total drive time of about four hours and twenty-six minutes; the greatest distance Cernan and Schmitt traveled from the lunar module was about 7.6 km (4.7 mi; 4.1 nmi).

This was the only mission to carry the TGE, which was built by Draper Laboratory at the Massachusetts Institute of Technology. As gravimeters had been useful in studying the Earth's internal structure, the objective of this experiment was to do the same on the Moon. The gravimeter was used to obtain relative gravity measurements at the landing site in the immediate vicinity of the lunar module, as well as various locations on the mission's traverse routes. Scientists would then use this data to help determine the geological substructure of the landing site and the surrounding vicinity. Measurements were taken while the TGE was mounted on the LRV, and also while the device was placed on the lunar surface. A total of 26 measurements were taken with the TGE during the mission's three moonwalks, with productive results.

The SEP was also unique to Apollo 17, and included two major components: a transmitting antenna deployed near the lunar module and a receiver mounted on the LRV. At different stops during the mission's traverses, electrical signals traveled from the transmitting device, through the ground, and were received at the LRV. The electrical properties of the lunar regolith could be determined by comparison of the transmitted and received electrical signals. The results of this experiment, which are consistent with lunar rock composition, show that there is almost no water in the area of the Moon in which Apollo 17 landed, to a depth of 2 km (1.2 mi; 1.1 nmi).

A 2.4 m (7.9 ft) long, 2 cm (0.79 in) diameter device, the Lunar Neutron Probe was inserted into one of the holes drilled into the surface to collect core samples. It was designed to measure the quantity of neutrons which penetrated to the detectors it bore along its length. This was intended to measure the rate of the "gardening" process on the lunar surface, whereby the regolith on the surface is slowly mixed or buried due to micrometeorites and other events. Placed during the first EVA, it was retrieved during the third and final EVA. The astronauts brought it with them back to Earth, and the measurements from it were compared with the evidence of neutron flux in the core that had been removed from the hole it had been placed in. Results from the probe and from the cores were instrumental in current theories that the top centimeter of lunar regolith turns over every million years, whereas "gardening" to a depth of one meter takes about a billion years.

=== Orbital science ===
==== Biological experiments ====
Apollo 17 EVA.

Apollo 17's CM carried a Biological Cosmic Ray Experiment (BIOCORE), containing five mice that had been implanted with radiation monitors under their scalps to see whether they suffered damage from cosmic rays. These animals were placed in individual metal tubes inside a sealed container that had its own oxygen supply, and flown on the mission. All five were pocket mice (Perognathus longimembris); this species was chosen because it was well-documented, small, easy to maintain in an isolated state (not requiring drinking water during the mission and with highly concentrated waste), and for its ability to withstand environmental stress. Officially, the mice—four male and one female—were assigned the identification numbers A3326, A3400, A3305, A3356 and A3352. Unofficially, according to Cernan, the Apollo 17 crew dubbed them Fee, Fi, Fo, Fum, and Phooey.

Four of the five mice survived the flight, though only two of them appeared healthy and active; the cause of death of the fifth mouse was not determined. Of those that survived, the study found lesions in the scalp itself and, in one case, the liver. The scalp lesions and liver lesions appeared to be unrelated to one another; nothing was found that could be attributed to cosmic rays.

The Biostack experiment was similar to one carried on Apollo 16, and was designed to test the effects of the cosmic rays encountered in space travel on microorganisms that were included, on seeds, and on the eggs of simple animals (brine shrimp and beetles), which were carried in a sealed container. After the mission, the microorganisms and seeds showed little effect, but many of the eggs of all species failed to hatch, or to mature normally; many died or displayed abnormalities.

==== Scientific Instrument Module ====
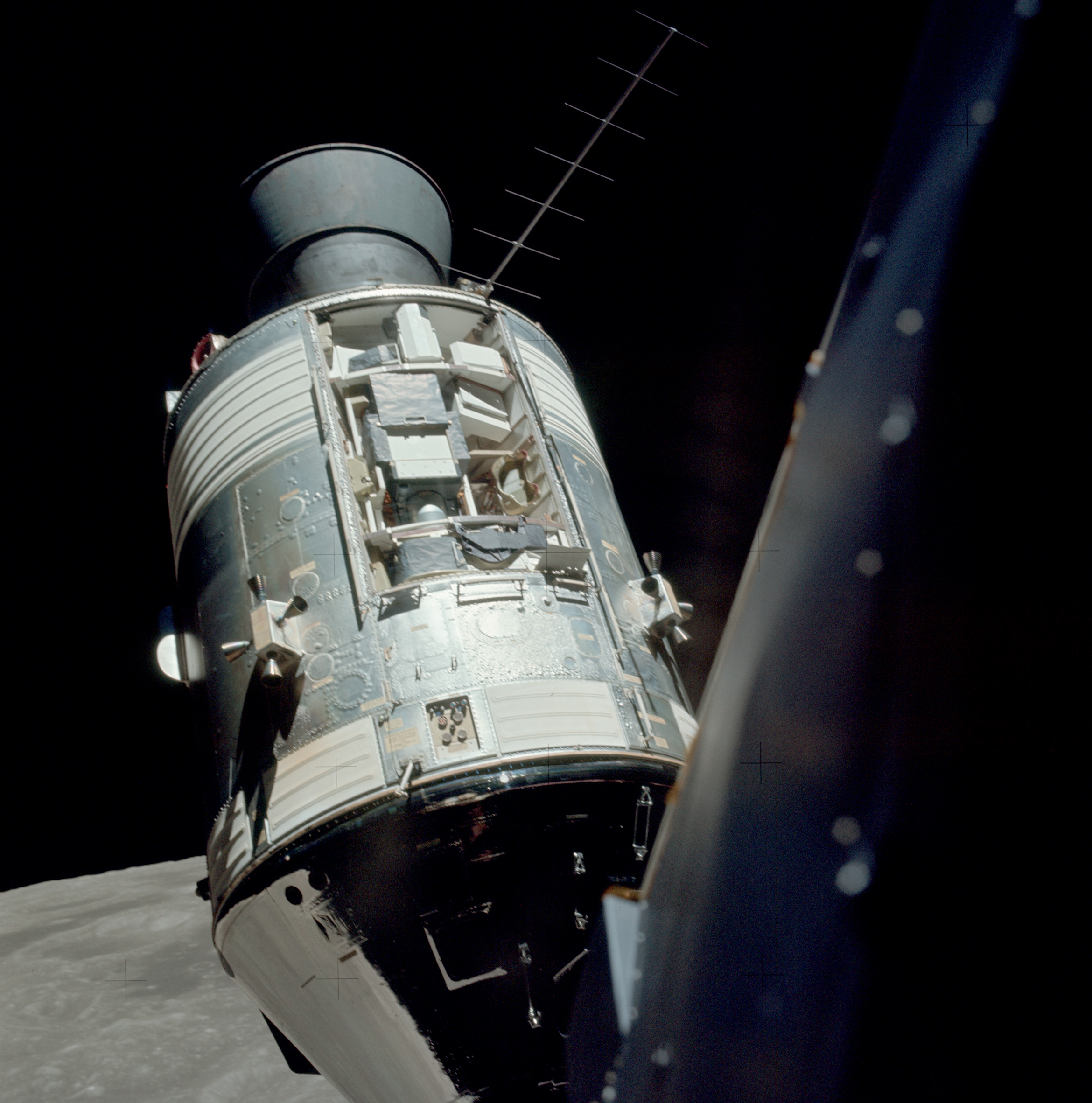
Apollo 17 SIM bay on the service module America, seen from the Lunar Module Challenger in orbit around the Moon

The Apollo 17 SM contained the scientific instrument module (SIM) bay. The SIM bay housed three new experiments for use in lunar orbit: a lunar sounder, an infrared scanning radiometer, and a far-ultraviolet spectrometer. A mapping camera, panoramic camera, and a laser altimeter, which had been carried previously, were also included in the SIM bay.

The lunar sounder was to beam electromagnetic impulses toward the lunar surface, which were designed with the objective of obtaining data to assist in developing a geological model of the interior of the Moon to an approximate depth of 1.3 km (0.81 mi). The infrared scanning radiometer was designed with the objective of generating a temperature map of the lunar surface to aid in locating surface features such as rock fields, structural differences in the lunar crust, and volcanic activity. The far-ultraviolet spectrometer was to be used to obtain information on the composition, density, and constituency of the lunar atmosphere. The spectrometer was also designed to detect far-UV radiation emitted by the Sun that had been reflected off the lunar surface. The laser altimeter was designed to measure the altitude of the spacecraft above the lunar surface within approximately 2 meters (6.6 feet), providing altitude information to the panoramic and mapping cameras, which were also in the SIM bay.

==== Light-flash phenomenon and other experiments ====
Beginning with Apollo 11, crew members observed light flashes that penetrated their closed eyelids. These flashes, described by the astronauts as "streaks" or "specks" of light, were usually observed while the spacecraft was darkened during a sleep period. These flashes, while not observed on the lunar surface, would average about two per minute and were observed by the crew members during the trip out to the Moon, back to Earth, and in lunar orbit.

The Apollo 17 crew repeated an experiment, also conducted on Apollo 16, with the objective of linking these light flashes with cosmic rays. Evans wore a device over his eyes that recorded the time, strength, and path of high-energy atomic particles that penetrated the device, while the other two wore blindfolds to keep out light. Investigators concluded that the available evidence supports the hypothesis that these flashes occur when charged particles travel through the retina in the eye.

Apollo 17 carried a sodium-iodide crystal identical to the ones in the gamma-ray spectrometer flown on Apollo 15 and 16. Data from this, once it was examined on Earth, was to be used to help form a baseline, allowing for subtraction of rays from the CM or from cosmic radiation to gain better data from the earlier results. In addition, the S-band transponders in the CSM and LM were pointed at the Moon to gain data on its gravitational field. Results from the Lunar Orbiter probes had revealed that lunar gravity varies slightly due to the presence of mass concentrations, or "mascons". Data from the missions, and from the lunar subsatellites left by Apollo 15 and 16, were used to map such variations in lunar gravity.

== Mission events ==
=== Launch and outbound trip ===
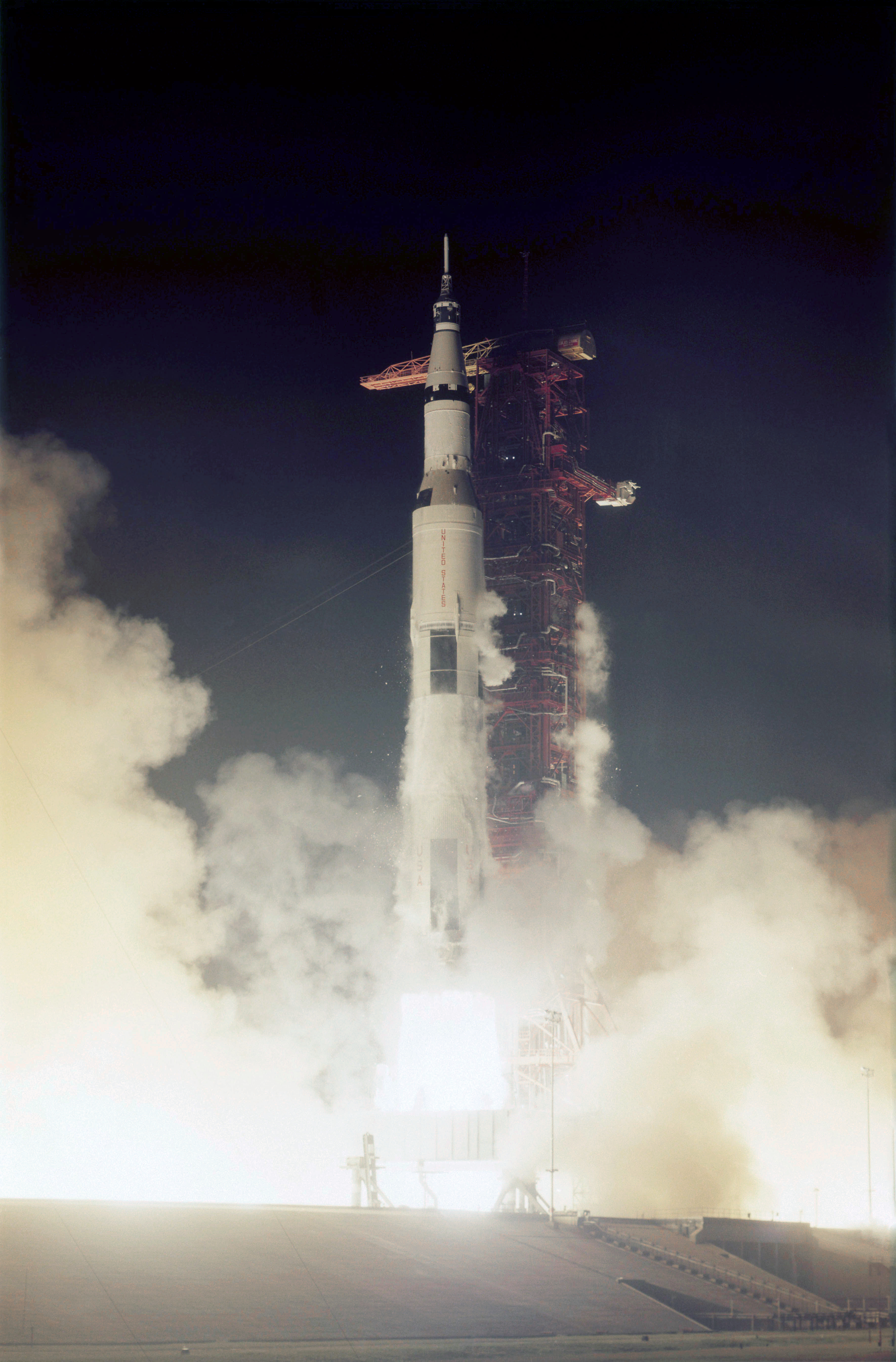
Apollo 17 launches on December 7, 1972

Originally planned to launch on December 6, 1972, at 9:53 p.m. EST (2:53 a.m. on December 7 UTC), Apollo 17 was the final crewed Saturn V launch, and the only one to occur at night. The launch was delayed by two hours and forty minutes due to an automatic cutoff in the launch sequencer at the T−30 second mark in the countdown. The cause of the problem was quickly determined to be the launch sequencer's failure to automatically pressurize the liquid oxygen tank in the third stage of the rocket; although launch control noticed this and manually caused the tank to pressurize, the sequencer did not recognize the fix and therefore paused the countdown. The clock was reset and held at the T−22 minute mark while technicians worked around the malfunction in order to continue with the launch. This pause was the only launch delay in the Apollo program caused by a hardware problem. The countdown then resumed, and the liftoff occurred at 12:33 a.m. EST on December 7, 1972. The launch window, which had begun at the originally planned launch time of 9:53 p.m. on December 6, remained open until 1:31 a.m., the latest time at which a launch could have occurred during the December 6–7 window.

Approximately 500,000 people observed the launch in the immediate vicinity of Kennedy Space Center, despite the early-morning hour. The launch was visible as far away as 800 km (500 mi; 430 nmi), and observers in Miami, Florida, reported a "red streak" crossing the northern sky. Among those in attendance at the program's final launch were astronauts Neil Armstrong and Dick Gordon, as well as centenarian Charlie Smith, who alleged he was 130 years old at the time of Apollo 17.

The ascent resulted in an orbit with an altitude and velocity almost exactly that which had been planned. In the hours following the launch, Apollo 17 orbited the Earth while the crew spent time monitoring and checking the spacecraft to ensure its readiness to depart Earth orbit. At 3:46 a.m. EST, the S-IVB third stage was reignited for the 351-second trans-lunar injection burn to propel the spacecraft towards the Moon. Ground controllers chose a faster trajectory for Apollo 17 than originally planned to allow the vehicle to reach lunar orbit at the planned time, despite the launch delay. The Command and Service Module separated from the S-IVB approximately half an hour following the S-IVB trans-lunar injection burn, after which Evans turned the spacecraft to face the LM, still attached to the S-IVB. The CSM then docked with the LM and extracted it from the S-IVB. Following the LM extraction, Mission Control programmed the S-IVB, no longer needed to propel the spacecraft, to impact the Moon and trip the seismometers left by prior Apollo crews. It struck the Moon just under 87 hours into the mission, triggering the seismometers from Apollo 12, 14, 15 and 16. Approximately nine hours after launch, the crew concluded the mission's first day with a sleep period, until waking up to begin the second day.

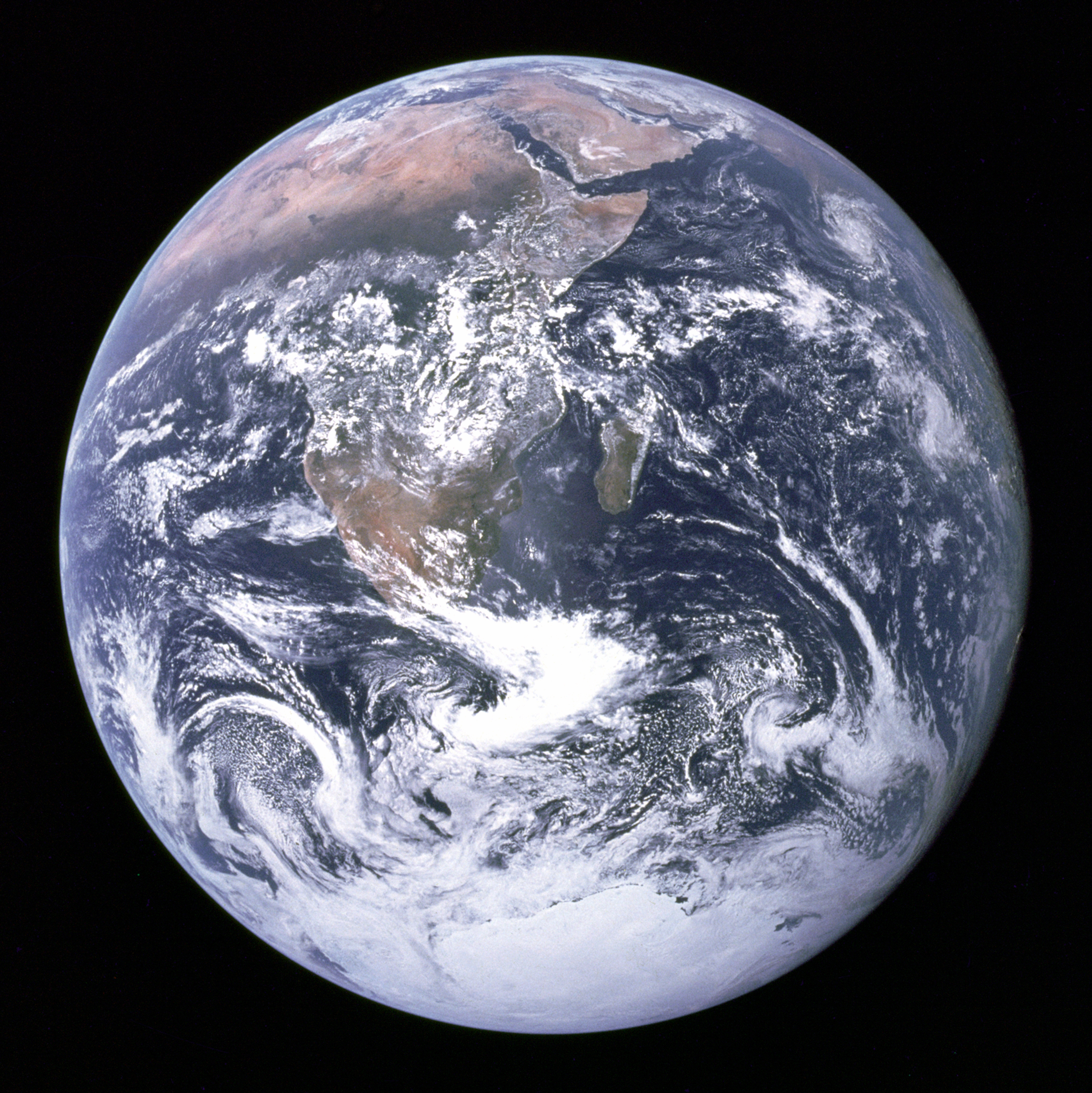
View of Earth from Apollo 17 while in transit to the Moon, a photo now known as The Blue Marble

Mission Control and the crew decided to shorten the mission's second day, the first full day in space, in order to adjust the crew's wake-up times for the subsequent days in preparation for an early morning (EST) wake-up time on the day of the lunar landing, then scheduled for early afternoon (EST). This was done since the first day of the mission had been extended because of the launch delay. Following the second rest period, and on the third day of the mission, the crew executed the first mid-course correction, a two-second burn of the CSM's service propulsion engine to adjust the spacecraft's Moon-bound trajectory. Following the burn, the crew opened the hatch separating the CSM and LM in order to check the LM's systems and concluded that they were nominal. So that events would take place at the time indicated in the flight plan, the mission clocks were moved ahead by 2 hours and 40 minutes, the amount of the launch delay, with one hour of it at 45:00:00 into the mission and the remainder at 65:00:00.

Among their other activities during the outbound trip, the crew photographed the Earth from the spacecraft as it travelled towards the Moon. One of these photographs is now known as The Blue Marble. The crew found that one of the latches holding the CSM and LM together was unlatched. While Schmitt and Cernan were engaged in a second period of LM housekeeping beginning just before sixty hours into the mission, Evans worked on the balky latch. He was successful, and left it in the position it would need to be in for the CSM-LM docking that would occur upon return from the lunar surface.

Also during the outward journey, the crew performed a heat flow and convection demonstration, as well as the Apollo light-flash experiment. A few hours before entry into lunar orbit, the SIM door on the SM was jettisoned. At approximately 2:47 p.m. EST on December 10, the service propulsion system engine on the CSM ignited to slow down the CSM/LM stack into lunar orbit. Following orbit insertion and orbital stabilization, the crew began preparations for the landing at Taurus–Littrow.

=== Lunar landing ===
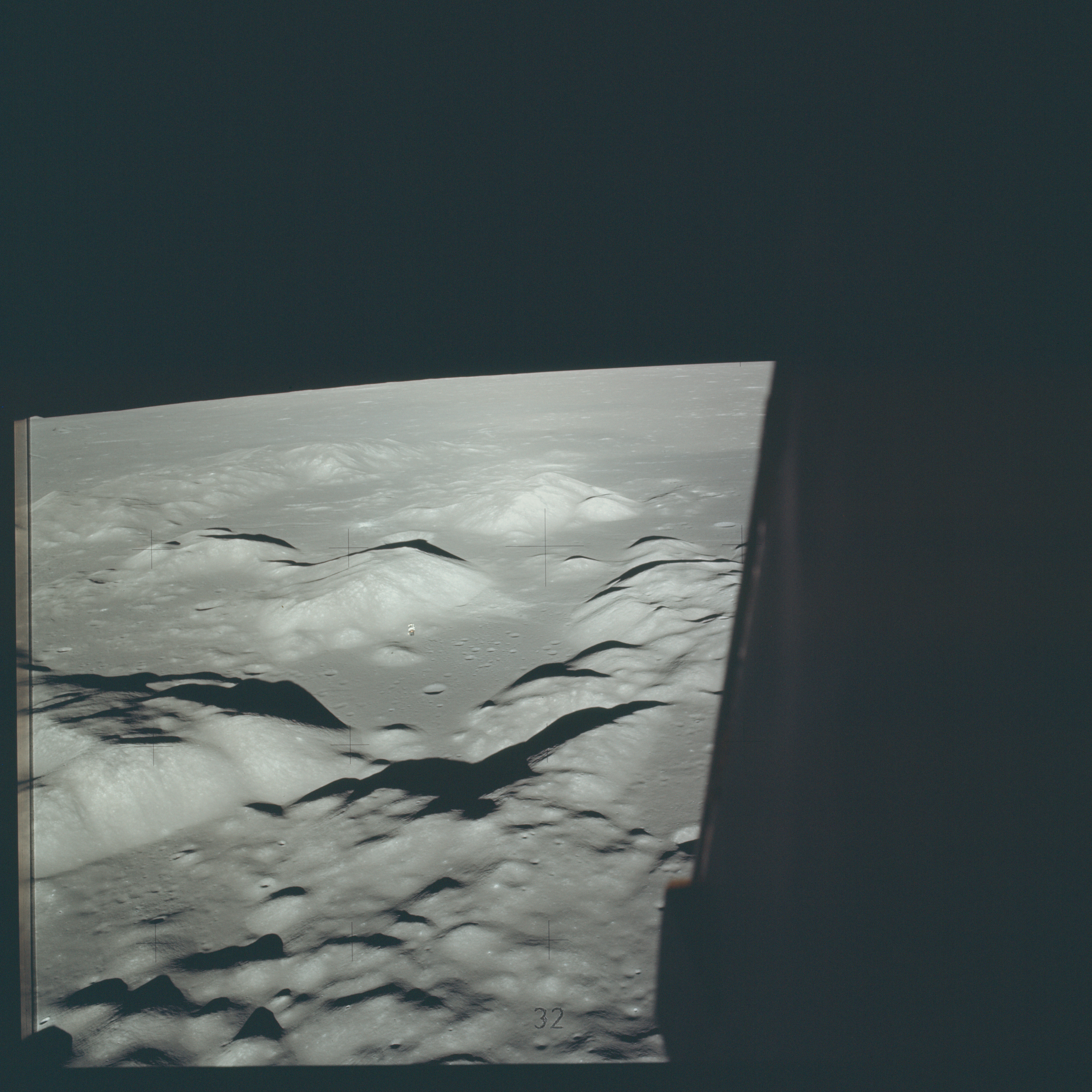
The valley of Taurus-Littrow as seen from the Lunar Module Challenger on the orbit before powered descent there. The Command and Service Module America can just be seen crossing the base of the 2.3 km high South Massif. Between the South and North Massifs, the valley is 7 km wide. Mare Serenitatis, the Sea of Serenity, is on the horizon.

The day of the landing began with a checkout of the Lunar Module's systems, which revealed no problems preventing continuation of the mission. Cernan, Evans, and Schmitt each donned their spacesuits, and Cernan and Schmitt entered the LM in preparation for separating from the CSM and landing. The LM undocked from the CSM, and the two spacecraft orbited close together for about an hour and a half while the astronauts made visual inspections and conducted their final pre-landing checks. After finally separating from the CSM, the LM Challenger and its crew of two adjusted their orbit, such that its lowest point would pass about 10.5 mi (16.9 km) above the landing site, and began preparations for the descent to Taurus–Littrow. While Cernan and Schmitt prepared for landing, Evans remained in orbit to take observations, perform experiments and await the return of his crewmates a few days later.

Soon after completing their preparations for landing and just over two hours following the LM's undocking from the CSM, Cernan and Schmitt began their descent to the Taurus–Littrow valley on the lunar surface with the ignition of the Lunar Module's descent propulsion system (DPS) engine. Approximately ten minutes later, as planned, the LM pitched over, giving Cernan and Schmitt their first look at the landing site during the descent phase and allowing Cernan to guide the spacecraft to a desirable landing target while Schmitt provided data from the flight computer essential for landing. The LM touched down on the lunar surface at 2:55 p.m. EST on December 11, just over twelve minutes after DPS ignition. Challenger landed about 656 feet (200 m) east of the planned landing point. Shortly thereafter, the two astronauts began re-configuring the LM for their stay on the surface and began preparations for the first moonwalk of the mission, or EVA-1.

=== Lunar surface ===
==== First EVA ====
Cernan on the lunar surface, December 13, 1972

During their approximately 75-hour stay on the lunar surface, Cernan and Schmitt performed three moonwalks (EVAs). The astronauts deployed the LRV, then emplaced the ALSEP and the seismic explosive charges. They drove the rover to nine planned geological-survey stations to collect samples and make observations. Additionally, twelve short sampling stops were made at Schmitt's discretion while riding the rover, during which the astronauts used a handled scoop to get a sample, without dismounting. During lunar-surface operations, Commander Cernan always drove the rover, while Lunar Module Pilot Schmitt was a passenger who assisted with navigation. This division of responsibilities between the two crew positions was used consistently throughout Apollo's J-missions.

The first lunar excursion began four hours after landing, at 6:54 p.m. EST on December 11. After exiting through the hatch of the LM and descending the ladder to the footpad, Cernan took the first step on the lunar surface of the mission. Just before doing so, Cernan remarked, "I'm on the footpad. And, Houston, as I step off at the surface at Taurus–Littrow, we'd like to dedicate the first step of Apollo 17 to all those who made it possible." After Cernan surveyed the exterior of the LM and commented on the immediate landing site, Schmitt joined Cernan on the surface. The first task was to offload the rover and other equipment from the LM. While working near the rover, Cernan caught his hammer under the right-rear fender extension, accidentally breaking it off. A similar incident occurred on Apollo 16 as John Young maneuvered around the rover. Although this was not a mission-critical issue, the loss of the part caused Cernan and Schmitt to be covered with dust stirred up when the rover was in motion. The crew made a short-lived fix using duct tape at the beginning of the second EVA, attaching a paper map to the damaged fender. Lunar dust stuck to the tape's surface, however, preventing it from adhering properly. Following deployment and testing the maneuverability of the rover, the crew deployed the ALSEP just west of the landing site. The ALSEP deployment took longer than had been planned, with the drilling of core holes presenting some difficulty, meaning the geological portion of the first EVA would need to be shortened, cancelling a planned visit to Emory crater. Instead, following the deployment of the ALSEP, Cernan and Schmitt drove to Steno crater, to the south of the landing site. The objective at Steno was to sample the subsurface material excavated by the impact that formed the crater. The astronauts gathered 14 kilograms (31 lb) of samples, took seven gravimeter measurements, and deployed two explosive packages. The explosive packages were later detonated remotely; the resulting explosions detected by geophones placed by the astronauts and also by seismometers left during previous missions. The first EVA ended after seven hours and twelve minutes. and the astronauts remained in the pressurized LM for the next 17 hours.

==== Second EVA ====
Astronauts Cernan and Schmitt singing "I Was Strolling on the Moon One Day" to the words and tune of the 1884 song "While Strolling Through the Park One Day"

On December 12, awakened by a recording of "Ride of the Valkyries" played from Mission Control, Cernan and Schmitt began their second lunar excursion. The first order of business was to provide the rover's fender a better fix. Overnight, the flight controllers devised a procedure communicated by John Young: taping together four stiff paper maps to form a "replacement fender extension" and then clamping it onto the fender. The astronauts carried out the new fix which did its job without failing until near the end of the third excursion. Cernan and Schmitt then departed for station 2—Nansen Crater, at the foot of the South Massif. When they arrived, their range from the Challenger was 7.6 kilometers (4.7 miles, 25,029 feet). This remains the furthest distance any spacefarers have ever traveled away from the safety of a pressurizable spacecraft while on a planetary body, and also during an EVA of any type. (Note: Apart from the Apollo program's moonwalks (and a unique trio of deep-space EVAs conducted during the program's J-missions), all other spacewalks have been conducted in Low-Earth orbit, of which almost all have involved a safety tether keeping the spacefarer attached to the spacecraft by a short distance. The exceptions occurred in 1984 and 1994, when a series of seven EVAs involved untethered activity using the Manned Maneuvering Unit (MMU) and the Simplified Aid For EVA Rescue Unit (SAFER). Among this latter group, the greatest distance traveled away from a spacecraft during orbital flight was approximately 100 meters (320 feet), achieved by Bruce McCandless on STS-41-B during the first test of the MMU.) The astronauts were at the extremity of their "walkback limit", a safety constraint meant to ensure that they could walk back to the LM if the rover failed. They began a return trip, traveling northeast in the rover.

At station 3, Schmitt fell to the ground while working, looking so awkward that Parker jokingly told him that NASA's switchboard had lit up seeking Schmitt's services for Houston's ballet group, and the site of station 3 was in 2019 renamed Ballet Crater. Cernan took a sample at Station 3 that was to be maintained in vacuum until better analytical techniques became available, joking with the CAPCOM, Parker, about placing a note inside. The container remained unopened until 2022.

Stopping at station 4—Shorty crater—the astronauts discovered orange soil, which proved to be very small beads of volcanic glass formed over 3.5 billion years ago. This discovery caused great excitement among the scientists at Mission Control, who felt that the astronauts may have discovered a volcanic vent. However, post-mission sample analysis revealed that Shorty is not a volcanic vent, but rather an impact crater. Analysis also found the orange soil to be a remnant of a lava fountain. This lava fountain sprayed molten lava high into the lunar sky in the Moon's early days, some 3.5 billion years ago and long before Shorty's creation. The orange volcanic beads were droplets of molten lava from the fountain that solidified and were buried by lava deposits until exposed by the impact that formed Shorty, less than 20 million years ago.

The final stop before returning to the LM was Camelot crater; throughout the sojourn, the astronauts collected 34 kilograms (75 lb) of samples, took another seven gravimeter measurements, and deployed three more explosive packages. Concluding the EVA at seven hours and thirty-seven minutes, Cernan and Schmitt had completed the longest-duration EVA in history to-date, traveling further away from a spacecraft and covering more ground on a planetary body during a single EVA than any other spacefarers. The improvised fender had remained intact throughout, causing the president of the "Auto Body Association of America" to award them honorary lifetime membership.

==== Third EVA ====
Composite image of Harrison Schmitt working next to Tracy's Rock during EVA-3

The third moonwalk, the last of the Apollo program, began at 5:25 p.m. EST on December 13. Cernan and Schmitt rode the rover northeast of the landing site, exploring the base of the North Massif and the Sculptured Hills. Stopping at station 6, they examined a house-sized split boulder dubbed Tracy's Rock (or Split Rock), after Cernan's daughter. The ninth and final planned station was conducted at Van Serg crater. The crew collected 66 kilograms (146 lb) of lunar samples and took another nine gravimeter measurements. Schmitt had seen a fine-grained rock, unusual for that vicinity, earlier in the mission and had stood it on its edge; before closing out the EVA, he went and got it. Subsequently, designated Sample 70215, it was, at 17.7 pounds (8.0 kg), the largest rock brought back by Apollo 17. A small piece of it is on exhibit at the Smithsonian Institution, one of the few rocks from the Moon that the public may touch. Schmitt also collected a sample, designated as Sample 76535, at geology station 6 near the base of the North Massif; the sample, a troctolite, was later identified as the oldest known "unshocked" lunar rock, meaning it has not been damaged by high-impact geological events. Scientists have therefore used Sample 76535 in thermochronological studies to determine if the Moon formed a metallic core or, as study results suggest, a core dynamo.

Before concluding the moonwalk, the crew collected a breccia rock, dedicating it to the nations of Earth, 70 of which were represented by students touring the U.S. and present in Mission Control Center in Houston, Texas, at the time. Portions of this sample, known as the Friendship Rock, were subsequently distributed to the nations represented by the students. A plaque located on the LM, commemorating the achievements made during the Apollo program, was then unveiled. Before reentering the LM for the final time, Cernan remarked,

... I'm on the surface; and, as I take man's last step from the surface, back home for some time to come – but we believe not too long into the future – I'd like to just [say] what I believe history will record. That America's challenge of today has forged man's destiny of tomorrow. And, as we leave the Moon at Taurus–Littrow, we leave as we came and, God willing, as we shall return, with peace and hope for all mankind. "Godspeed the crew of Apollo 17."

Cernan then followed Schmitt into the LM; the final lunar excursion had a duration of seven hours and fifteen minutes. Following closing of the LM hatch and repressurization of the LM cabin, Cernan and Schmitt removed their spacesuits and reconfigured the cabin for a final rest period on the lunar surface. As they did following each of the previous two EVAs, Cernan and Schmitt discussed their geological observations from the day's excursion with mission control while preparing to rest.

=== Solo activities ===
While Cernan and Schmitt were on the lunar surface, Evans remained alone in the CSM in lunar orbit and was assigned a number of observational and scientific tasks to perform while awaiting the return of his crewmates. In addition to the operation of the various orbital science equipment contained in the CSM's SIM bay, Evans conducted both visual and photographic observation of surface features from his aerial vantage point. The orbit of the CSM having been modified to an elliptical orbit in preparation for the LM's departure and eventual descent, one of Evans' solo tasks in the CSM was to circularize its orbit such that the CSM would remain at approximately the same distance above the surface throughout its orbit. Evans observed geological features visible to him and used handheld cameras to record certain visual targets. Evans also observed and sketched the solar corona at "sunrise", or the period of time during which the CSM would pass from the darkened portion of the Moon to the illuminated portion when the Moon itself mostly obscured the sun. To photograph portions of the surface that were not illuminated by the sunlight while Evans passed over them, Evans relied in conjunction on exposure and Earthlight. Evans photographed such features as the craters Eratosthenes and Copernicus, as well as the vicinity of Mare Orientale, using this technique. According to the Apollo 17 Mission Report, Evans was able to capture all scientific photographic targets, as well as some other targets of interest.

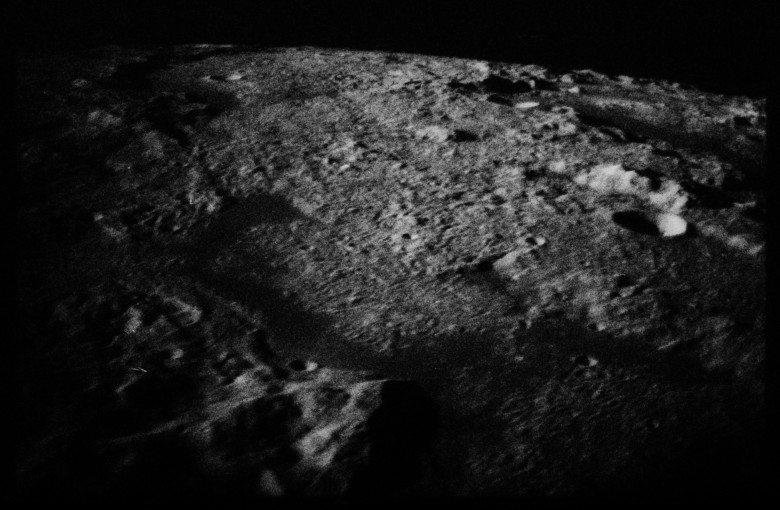
An oblique, black-and-white view of a portion of Mare Orientale from the CSM, illustrating the illuminating effect of Earthlight on the lunar terrain below during local nighttime; Evans reported seeing a light "flash" apparently originating from the surface in this area

Similarly to the crew of Apollo 16, Evans (as well as Schmitt, while in lunar orbit) reported seeing light "flashes" apparently originating from the lunar surface, known as transient lunar phenomena (TLP); Evans reported seeing these "flashes" in the vicinity of Grimaldi crater and Mare Orientale. The causes of TLP are not well-understood and, though inconclusive as an explanation, both of the sites in which Evans reported seeing TLP are the general locations of outgassing from the Moon's interior. Meteorite impacts are another possible explanation.

The flight plan kept Evans busy, making him so tired he overslept one morning by an hour, despite the efforts of Mission Control to awaken him. Before the LM departed for the lunar surface, Evans had discovered that he had misplaced his pair of scissors, necessary to open food packets. Cernan and Schmitt lent him one of theirs. The instruments in the SIM bay functioned without significant hindrance during the orbital portion of the mission, though the lunar sounder and the mapping camera encountered minor problems. Evans spent approximately 148 total hours in lunar orbit, including solo time and time spent together with Cernan and Schmitt, which is more time than any other individual has spent orbiting the Moon.

Evans was also responsible for piloting the CSM during the orbital phase of the mission, maneuvering the spacecraft to alter and maintain its orbital trajectory. In addition to the initial orbital recircularization maneuver shortly after the LM's departure, one of the solo activities Evans performed in the CSM in preparation for the return of his crewmates from the lunar surface was the plane change maneuver. This maneuver was meant to align the CSM's trajectory to the eventual trajectory of the LM to facilitate rendezvous in orbit. Evans fired the SPS engine of the CSM for about 20 seconds in successfully adjusting the CSM's orbital plane.

=== Return to Earth ===
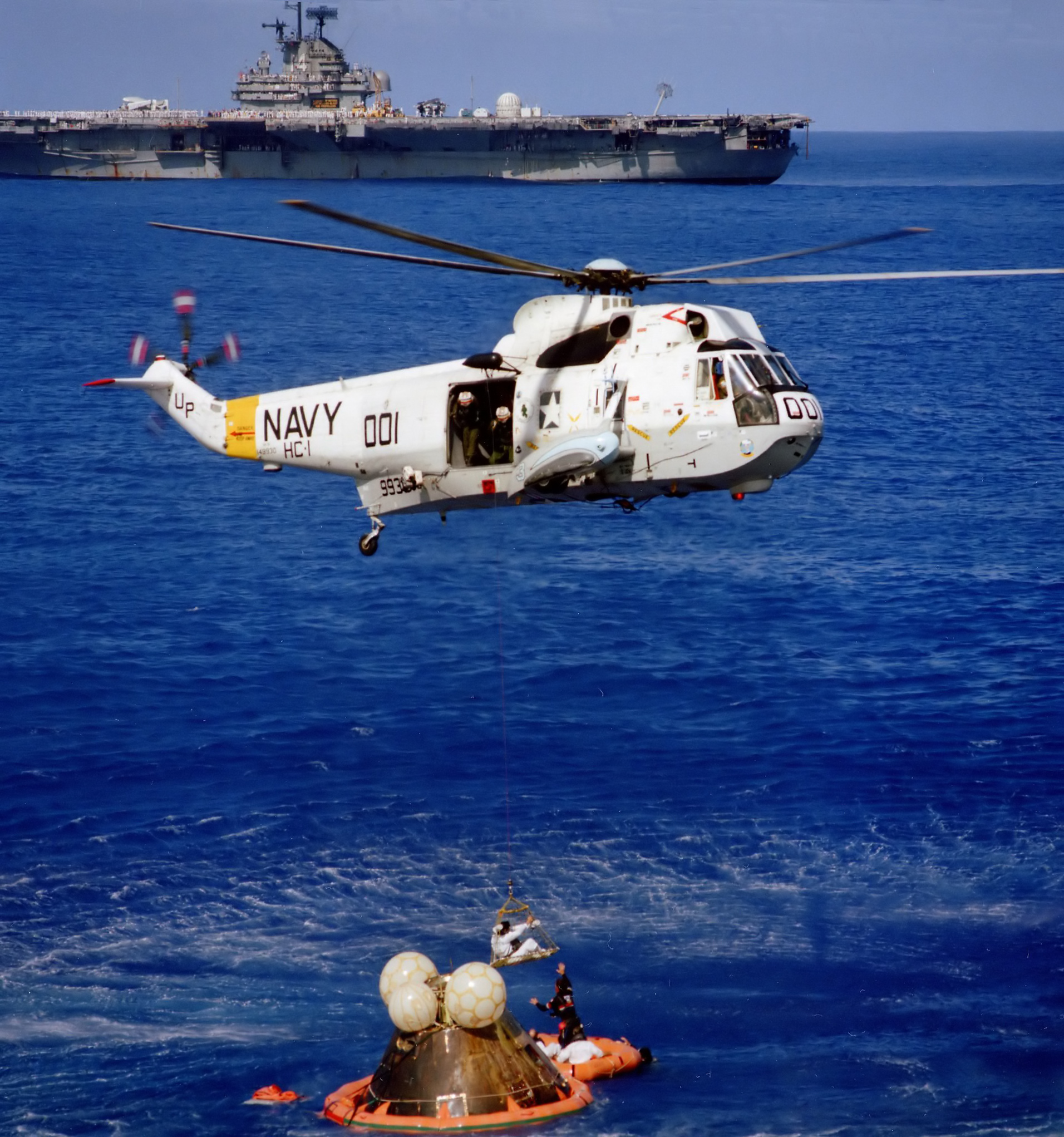
Apollo 17 post-splashdown recovery operations

Cernan and Schmitt lifted off from the lunar surface in the ascent stage of the LM on December 14, at 5:54 p.m. EST. The return to lunar orbit took just over seven minutes. The LM, piloted by Cernan, and the CSM, piloted by Evans, maneuvered, and redocked about two hours after liftoff from the surface. After docking, the crew transferred equipment and lunar samples from the LM to the CSM for return to Earth. The crew sealed the hatches between the CSM and the LM ascent stage following completion of the transfer and the LM was jettisoned at 11:51 p.m. EST on December 14. The unoccupied ascent stage was then remotely deorbited, crashing it into the Moon with an impact recorded by the seismometers left by Apollo 17 and previous missions. At 6:35 p.m. EST on December 16, the CSM's SPS engine was ignited once more to propel the spacecraft away from the Moon on a trajectory back towards Earth. The trans-Earth injection SPS burn lasted just over two minutes.

During the return to Earth, Evans performed a 65-minute EVA to retrieve film cassettes from the service module's SIM bay, with assistance from Schmitt who remained at the command module's hatch. At approximately 160,000 nautical miles (184,000 mi; 296,000 km) from Earth, it was the third "deep space" EVA in history, performed at great distance from any planetary body. As of 2026, it remains one of only three such EVAs, all performed during Apollo's J-missions under similar circumstances. It was the last EVA of the Apollo program.

During the trip back to Earth, the crew operated the infrared radiometer in the SM, as well as the ultraviolet spectrometer. One midcourse correction was performed, lasting 9 seconds. On December 19, the crew jettisoned the no-longer-needed SM, leaving only the CM for return to Earth. The Apollo 17 spacecraft reentered Earth's atmosphere and splashed down safely in the Pacific Ocean at 2:25 p.m. EST, 6.4 kilometers (4.0 mi) from the recovery ship, USS Ticonderoga. Cernan, Evans, and Schmitt were then retrieved by a recovery helicopter piloted by Commander Edward E. Dahill, III and were safe aboard the recovery ship 52 minutes after splashdown. As the final Apollo mission concluded successfully, Mission Control in Houston was filled with many former flight controllers and astronauts, who applauded as America returned to Earth.

== Aftermath and spacecraft locations ==
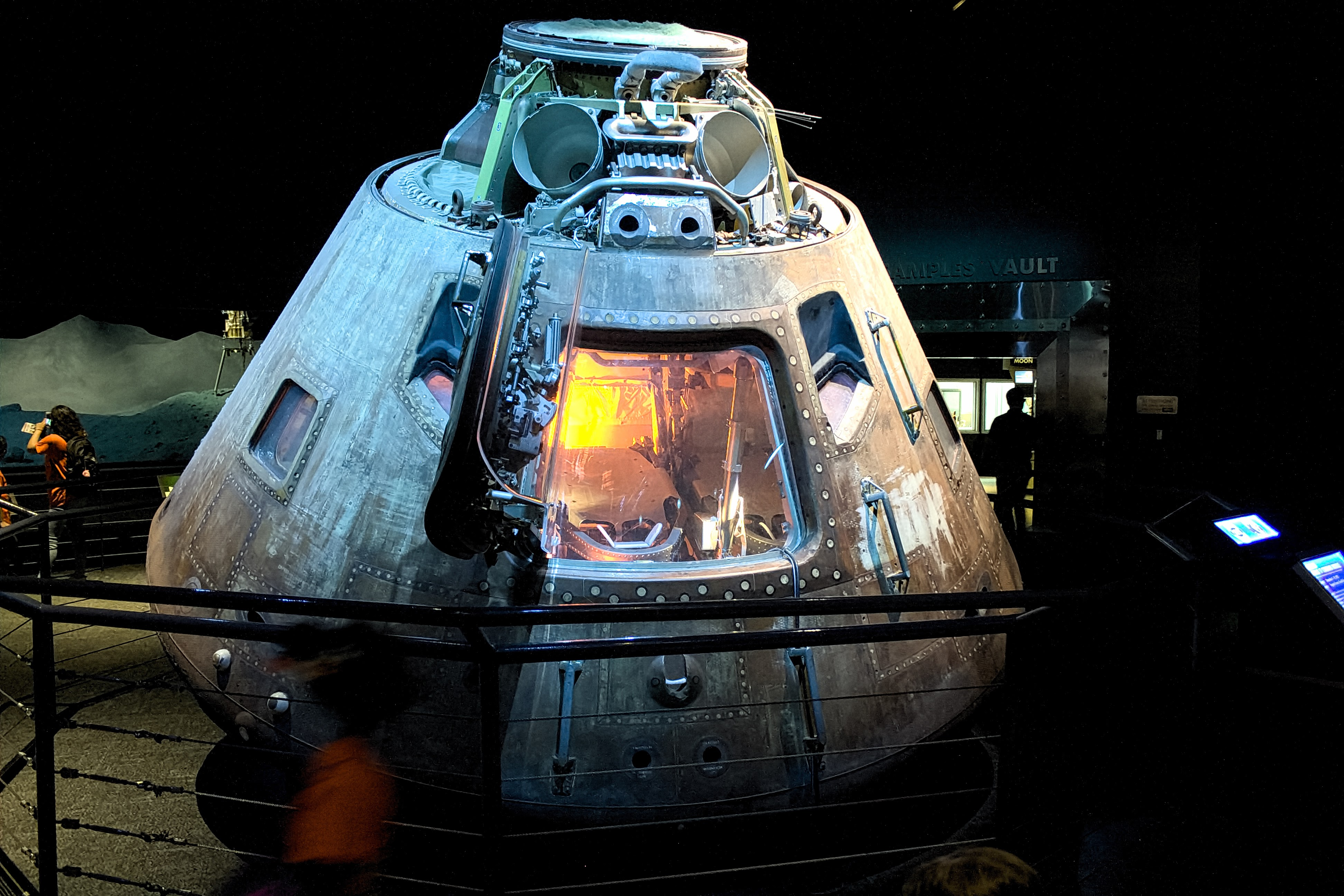
Apollo 17 command module America, on display at Space Center Houston

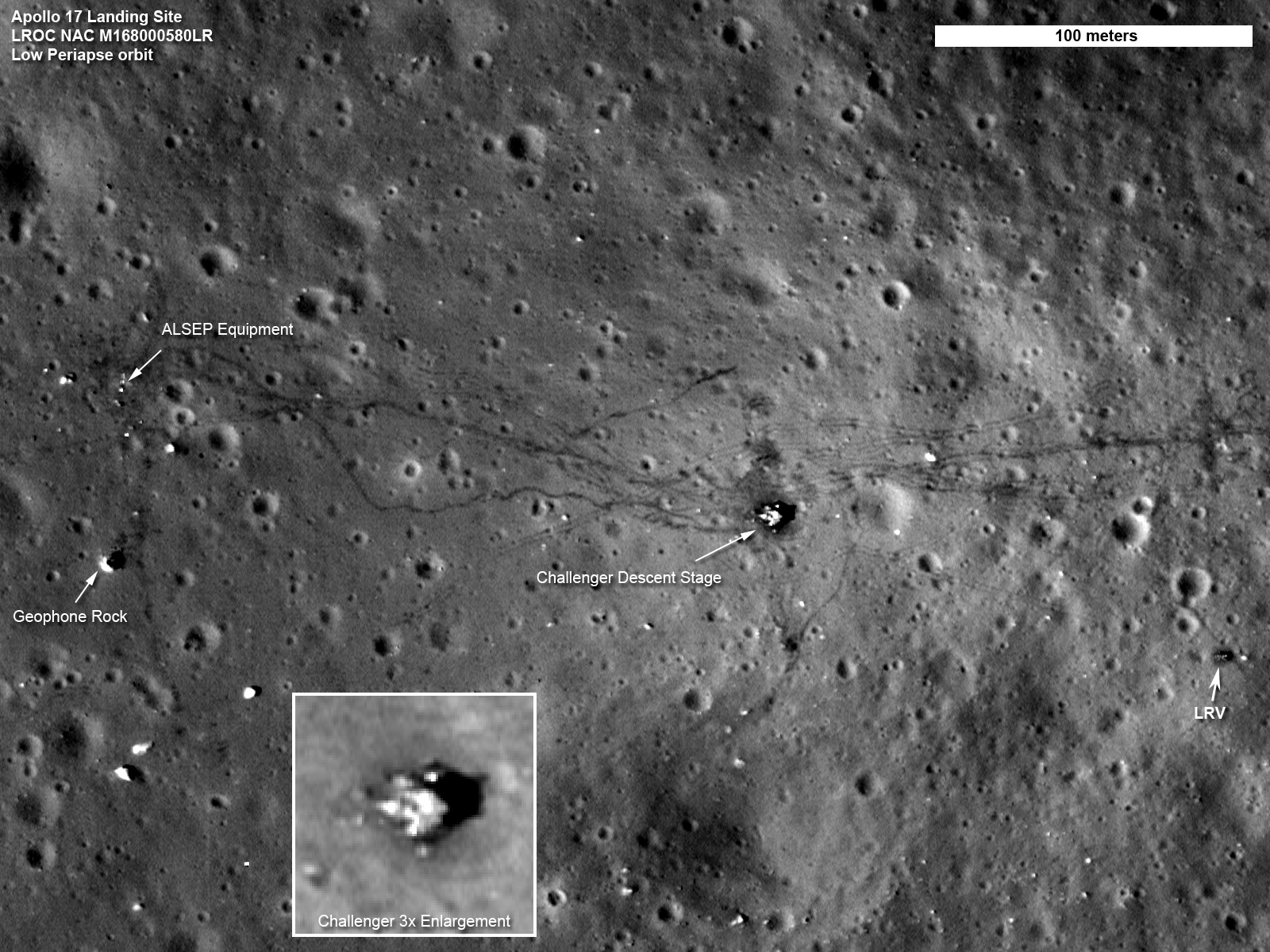
Lunar Reconnaissance Orbiter image of the Apollo 17 mission site taken in 2011, the Challenger descent stage is in the center, the Lunar Roving Vehicle appears in the lower right.

Following their mission, the crew undertook both domestic and international tours, visiting 29 states and 11 countries. The tour kicked off at Super Bowl VII, with the crew leading the crowd in the Pledge of Allegiance; the CM America was also displayed during the pregame activities.

None of the Apollo 17 astronauts flew in space again. Cernan retired from NASA and the Navy in 1976. He died in 2017. Evans retired from the Navy in 1976 and from NASA in 1977, entering the private sector. He died in 1990. Schmitt resigned from NASA in 1975 prior to his successful run for a United States Senate seat from New Mexico in 1976. There, he served one six-year term.

The Command Module America is currently on display at Space Center Houston at the Lyndon B. Johnson Space Center in Houston, Texas. The ascent stage of Lunar Module Challenger impacted the Moon on December 15, 1972, at 06:50:20.8 UTC (1:50 a.m. EST), at 19.96°N 30.50°E. The descent stage remains on the Moon at the landing site, 20.19080°N 30.77168°E. In 2023, a study of Apollo-era data from the Lunar Seismic Profiling Experiment showed that the descent stage was causing very slight tremors each lunar morning as components expanded in the heat.

Eugene Cernan's flown Apollo 17 spacesuit is in the collection of the Smithsonian's National Air and Space Museum (NASM), where it was transferred in 1974, and Harrison Schmitt's is in storage at NASM's Paul E. Garber Facility. Amanda Young of NASM indicated in 2004 that Schmitt's suit is in the best condition of the flown Apollo lunar spacesuits, and therefore is not on public display. Ron Evans' spacesuit was also transferred from NASA in 1974 to the collection of the NASM; it remains in storage.

Since Apollo 17's return, there have been attempts to photograph the landing site, where the LM's descent stage, LRV and some other mission hardware, remain. In 2009 and again in 2011, the Lunar Reconnaissance Orbiter photographed the landing site from increasingly low orbits. At least one group has indicated an intention to visit the site as well; in 2018, the German space company PTScientists said that it planned to land two lunar rovers nearby.

In 2026, the United States government declassified several records on unidentified anomalous phenomena, including a photograph from Apollo 17 which showed "three 'dots' in a triangular formation in the lower right quadrant of the lunar sky". The Pentagon stated there was "no consensus about the nature of the anomaly," but that a preliminary analysis indicated it was possibly a "physical object."

== See also ==
- List of Apollo missions
- List of missions to the Moon
- List of astronauts by year of selection
- List of human spaceflights
- List of human spaceflight programs
- List of landings on extraterrestrial bodies
- List of crewed spacecraft
- List of NASA missions
- List of spacewalks and moonwalks 1965–1999
- Moon landing
- The Case of the Missing Moon Rocks
- Apollo in Real Time

== Bibliography ==
- Apollo 17 Mission Report (PDF). Houston, Texas: Scientific and Technical Information Branch, NASA. 1973. Archived (PDF) from the original on October 9, 2022.
- Apollo 17 Preliminary Science Report (PDF). Houston, Texas: Manned Spacecraft Center, NASA. 1973. Archived (PDF) from the original on October 9, 2022.
- Apollo 17 Press Kit. Washington, D.C.: NASA. 1972. Archived from the original on May 23, 2022.
- Brooks, Courtney G.; Grimwood, James M.; Swenson, Loyd S. Jr. (1979). Chariots for Apollo: A History of Manned Lunar Spacecraft (PDF). NASA History Series. Washington, D.C.: Scientific and Technical Information Branch, NASA. ISBN 978-0-486-46756-6. LCCN 79001042. OCLC 4664449. NASA SP-4205. Archived (PDF) from the original on October 9, 2022.
- Burgess, Colin; Dubbs, Chris (2007). Animals in Space: From Research Rockets to the Space Shuttle. Berlin, Germany: Springer Science & Business Media. ISBN 978-0-387-49678-8.
- Chaikin, Andrew (1995) [1994]. A Man on the Moon: The Voyages of the Apollo Astronauts. Foreword by Tom Hanks. New York City: Penguin Books. ISBN 978-0-14-024146-4.
- Compton, William D. (1989). Where No Man Has Gone Before: A History of Apollo Lunar Exploration Missions. Washington, D.C.: U.S. Government Printing Office. OCLC 1045558568. SP-4214. Archived from the original on May 15, 2021.
- Cortright, Edgar M., ed. (2019). Apollo Expeditions to the Moon. Mineola, New York: Dover Publications. ISBN 978-0-486-83652-2.
- Crotts, Arlin (2014). The New Moon: Water, Exploration, and Future Habitation. Cambridge, United Kingdom: Cambridge University Press. ISBN 978-0-521-76224-3. Archived from the original on February 27, 2024.
- Johnston, Richard S.; Berry, Charles A.; Dietlein, Lawrence F., eds. (1975). Biomedical Results of Apollo. Vol. NASA-SP-368. Washington, D.C.: Science and Technical Information Office, NASA. OCLC 1906749. NASA SP-368. Archived from the original on March 26, 2023.
- Kraft, Christopher C. (2002). Flight: My Life in Mission Control. New York City: E. P. Dutton. ISBN 978-0-452-28304-6.
- Lattimer, Dick (1985). All We Did Was Fly to the Moon. History-alive series. Vol. 1. Foreword by James A. Michener (1st ed.). Gainesville, Florida: Whispering Eagle Press. ISBN 978-0-9611228-0-5.
- Logsdon, John M. (2015). After Apollo? : Richard Nixon and the American Space Program. New York City: Palgrave Macmillan. ISBN 978-1-137-43853-9.
- Orloff, Richard W. (2004) [First published 2000]. Apollo by the Numbers: A Statistical Reference. NASA History Series. Washington, D.C.: NASA. ISBN 0-16-050631-X. LCCN 00061677. NASA SP-2000-4029. Archived from the original on August 23, 2007.
- Orloff, Richard W.; Harland, David M. (2006). Apollo: The Definitive Sourcebook. Chichester, United Kingdom: Praxis Publishing Company. ISBN 978-0-387-30043-6.
- Phinney, William C. (2015). Science Training History of the Apollo Astronauts (PDF). Houston, Texas: Johnson Space Center, NASA. SP-2015-626. Archived (PDF) from the original on October 9, 2022.
- Riley, Christopher; Woods, David; Dolling, Philip (2012). Lunar Rover: Owner's Workshop Manual. Sparkford, United Kingdom: Haynes. ISBN 978-0-85733-267-7.
- Shayler, David J.; Burgess, Colin (2017). The Last of NASA's Original Pilot Astronauts: Expanding the Space Frontier in the Late Sixties. Chichester, United Kingdom: Springer. ISBN 978-3-319-51014-9. Archived from the original on February 27, 2024.
- Slayton, Donald K. "Deke"; Cassutt, Michael (1994). Deke! U.S. Manned Space: From Mercury to the Shuttle (1st ed.). New York City: Forge. ISBN 0-312-85503-6. LCCN 94002463. OCLC 29845663.
- Swift, Earl (2021). Across the Airless Wilds (eBook ed.). New York City: Custom House. ISBN 978-0-06-298653-5.
- Wilhelms, Don E. (1993). To a Rocky Moon: A Geologist's History of Lunar Exploration. Tempe, Arizona: University of Arizona Press. ISBN 978-0-8165-1065-8. Archived from the original on February 1, 2022.
