= Biostack experiment =

Bioscience experiment in 1972

The Apollo-era Biostack experiment was a NASA-run bioscience experiment flown aboard Apollo 16 (launched April 16, 1972) and Apollo 17 (launched December 7, 1972). The goal of these experiments was to study the effects of high-energy cosmic rays on biological materials. The experiments contained various biological materials including bacterial spores, seeds, and the eggs of a variety of species. The principal investigator was H. Bücker of the University of Frankfurt.

== Background ==
Heavy-ion high-energy cosmic rays were discovered in 1948 and it was discovered in rapid succession this type of radiation had a substantial propensity to interact with biological materials with physical manifestations. Balloons provided the first means for scientists to explore this interaction. Mice were studied for the increased speed with which their coats greyed, monkeys and mice were both studied for the damage to brain tissues, and both the eggs of brine shrimp and the embryos of maize plants showed evidence of damage at the cellular level.

During the Apollo 11 mission, Buzz Aldrin and Neil Armstrong reported observing flashes of light whenever they had their eyes closed or when the inside of their spacecraft was dimly lit. Every Apollo mission subsequently reported the exact same phenomenon. It was surmised that the cause of these light emissions were the result of heavy-ion cosmic rays interacting with the light-detecting cells in the retina of a human eye. This had been predicted in 1952 by Cornelius Tobias but the documentary evidence from the in-flight experiences of astronauts brought greater attention to the potential effects of cosmic rays on biological materials in general but in particular astronauts.

Cosmic rays result in the transference of a large amount of energy in a highly localized area, and this aspect differs substantially from X-rays and gamma rays which exhibit more diffuse effects. There was concern about the potential effects on the nervous system because this highly localized energy transference could result in the destruction of the cells. Whilst it was possible to assess the total dose absorption, the effects of the radiation are distinct from electromagnetic radiation. This necessitated in-situ experimentation with high-energy cosmic rays and Apollo 16 and Apollo 17 were identified as opportunities to explore their properties.

== Experiment ==
To correlate cosmic-ray interactions with the effects on biological matter, there was a need to be able to track incoming energetic particles immediately prior to its interaction with the biological material. To achieve this, the Biostack experiment consisted of layers of biological samples suspended with PVA, sandwiched between various types of radiation detectors. Each layer of biological sample would consist of a discrete type of biological specimen. Seven different species were used including bacterial spores, plant seeds, protozoal cysts and animal eggs. These layers were contained within a 10 cm (3.9 in) long and 12.5 cm (4.9 in) diameter aluminum case that was hermetically sealed.

Eight experiment units were built, with four identical units for each flight. One of these four units was designated the flight unit along with another designated a flight backup. The third of the four units would be used as a ground-based control. The fourth unit was kept in Frankfurt as a laboratory control. Since both flight units were used for their respective flights, the backup flight units were used for further experimentation on both flights. The backup flight unit on Biostack I was flown on a balloon from Fort Churchill, Canada, and the Biostack II backup flight unit was irradiated at University of California, Berkeley.

On return to Earth, the Biostack would be disassembled. Coordinate grids would be projected onto the layer and its surface photographed. This would allow the recording of the positions of items of interest whether that would be the locations of the biological specimens or the locations where cosmic rays had interacted with the detector.

== Science ==
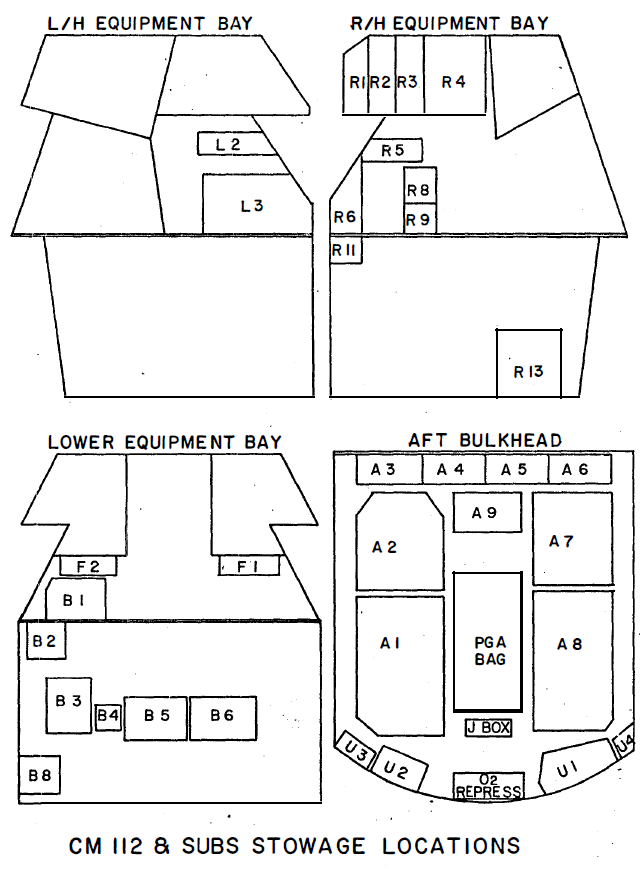
A diagram of the stowage locations for the command module of Apollo 16. Compartment R1, where the Biostack experiment was stowed in, is visible in the Right Hand Equipment Bay.

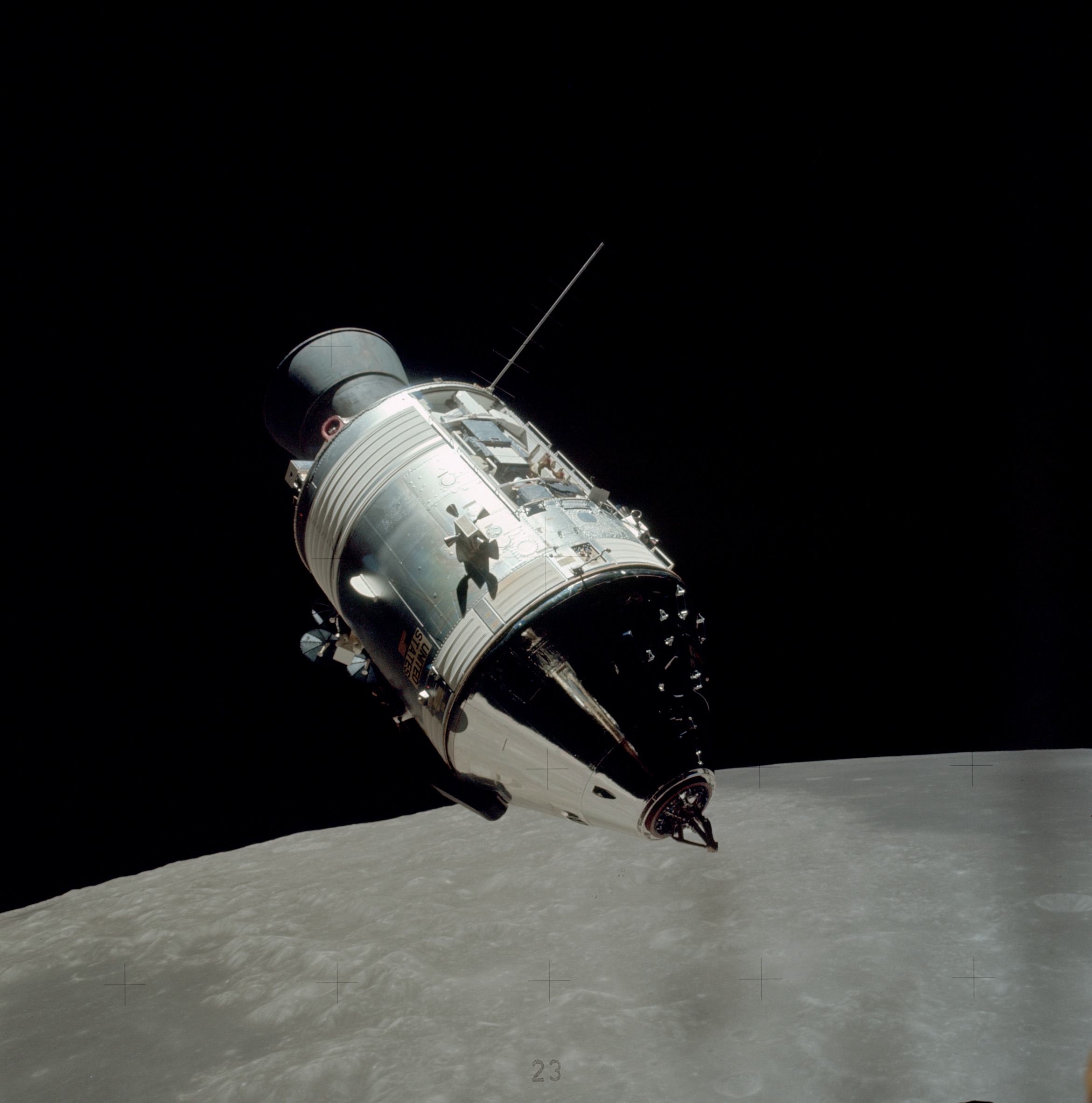
The Apollo 17 Command and Service Modules over the surface of the moon

Biostack I flew on board Apollo 16, which launched on April 16, 1972, and Biostack II flew on board Apollo 17 which launched on December 7, 1972. The experiment on both missions was stored in the R1 compartment inside the command module. This was specifically chosen to limit the amount of radiation shielding.

The results of the experiment showed widely differing impacts on biological processes. Whilst some showed little evidence of the influence of ionising radiation, other samples showed substantial effects with processes disrupted or outright inhibited. The strain of species used had a substantial impact on their response to being hit by high-energy particles showing in species variation in terms of radiation resistance. Artemia salina eggs that were hit by energetic particles showed substantial impacts to their development. Even in the most resistant strain, successful hatching rates were curtailed to only 15%. Those that survived hatching would often die during their first molt. Many development complexities in the nauplius occurred such as malformed thoraxes, growing two abdomina, or short limbs. Whilst there were clearly negative outcomes for those eggs that were hit by high-energy cosmic rays, it was also noted that the stresses of spaceflight would have been a compounding factor, as evidenced by curtailed development by non-hit eggs flown on the experiment.

Bacillus subtilis spores showed only mild impacts to germination from hits by high-energy cosmic rays but achieving outgrowth was substantially reduced to less than 50% for spores. These bacterial spores however, showed limited impact from other background radiation sources.
