= Lunar Traverse Gravimeter =

Experiment on Apollo 17

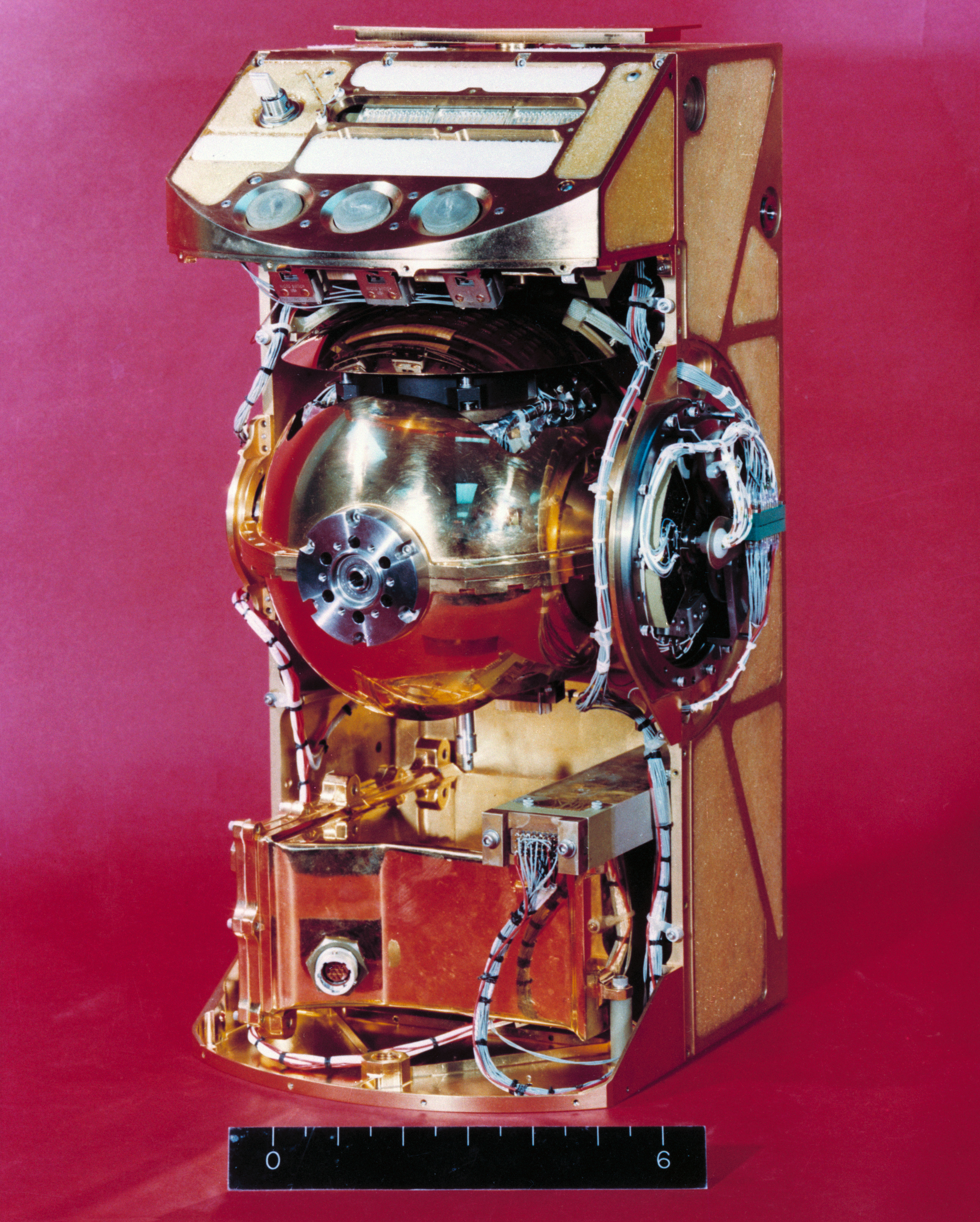
- Apollo 17 pre-flight lab photo of the Traverse Gravimeter without its blue external cover
- Acronym: LTG
- Other names: Traverse Gravimeter, Lunar Traverse Gravimeter Experiment
- Uses: Lunar surface gravity survey
- Notable experiments: Apollo 17
- Manufacturer: Draper Laboratory

The Lunar Traverse Gravimeter was a lunar science experiment, deployed by astronauts on the lunar surface in 1972 as part of Apollo 17. The goal of the experiment was to use relative gravity measurements to infer potential attributes about the geological substrata near the Apollo 17 landing site.

== Background ==
The concept of the experiment was to take a proven technology and methodology in the form of marine gravity surveys and design an instrument that could be operated in a mobile manner by an astronaut on the surface of the Moon. The direct inspiration for this instrument was the MIT Vibrating String Surface-Ship Gravimeter. This device was itself derived from surplus accelerometers, originally made by Bosch, that were in operational use on the SM-65 Atlas intercontinental ballistic missile.

This type of accelerometer was a pendular accelerometer, where changes in gravity results in minute changes in the tension of a suspended vibrating string. These changes in the tension of the string result in a change of the strings harmonic resonance, which can be measured via an induced voltage as the string passes through a permanent magnetic field.

Inertial guidance accelerometers, like those in intercontinental ballistic missiles, were particularly suited to the purpose of an astronaut operated traversal gravimeter due to three main attributes: a large range of sensitivity, comparatively small size and weight, and the ability to calibrate the instrument under low acceleration conditions.

== Instrument ==
Built by Draper Laboratory, the instrument weighed approximately 25 lbs and was around 20 inches tall and 11 inches wide. Power to the instrument was provided by an internal 7.5 volt battery capable of outputting up to 340 watt hours over a 15-day period.

The primary sensor used in the instrument was the Bosch Arma D4E Vibrating String Accelerometer. The sensor combined two strings, oriented in opposite directions and connected to each other. This was beneficial as the two strings and measurement points acting in opposite would counter any induced centripetal or tensional forces induced by the sensors permanent magnetic fields. Integration of the sensor and construction of the instrument housing and mounting was undertaken by Draper Laboratory at the Massachusetts Institute of Technology. To provide levelling, the sensor was mounted to a frame that sat in a two-axis gimbal. Sensors would direct motors that would level the gimbal in a proper orientation.

The vibrating string accelerometer was extremely sensitive to changes in temperature and so the instrument had a number of thermal control mechanisms. The sensor was housed within two nested ovens, that would work together to actively ensure the sensor was maintained at a temperature of 322 Kelvin with an accuracy of 0.01 Kelvin. The device was wrapped in a thermal blanket to provide insulation. The device was also equipped with a radiator that could be opened and closed depending on whether the device in use or not.

== Operation and deployment ==
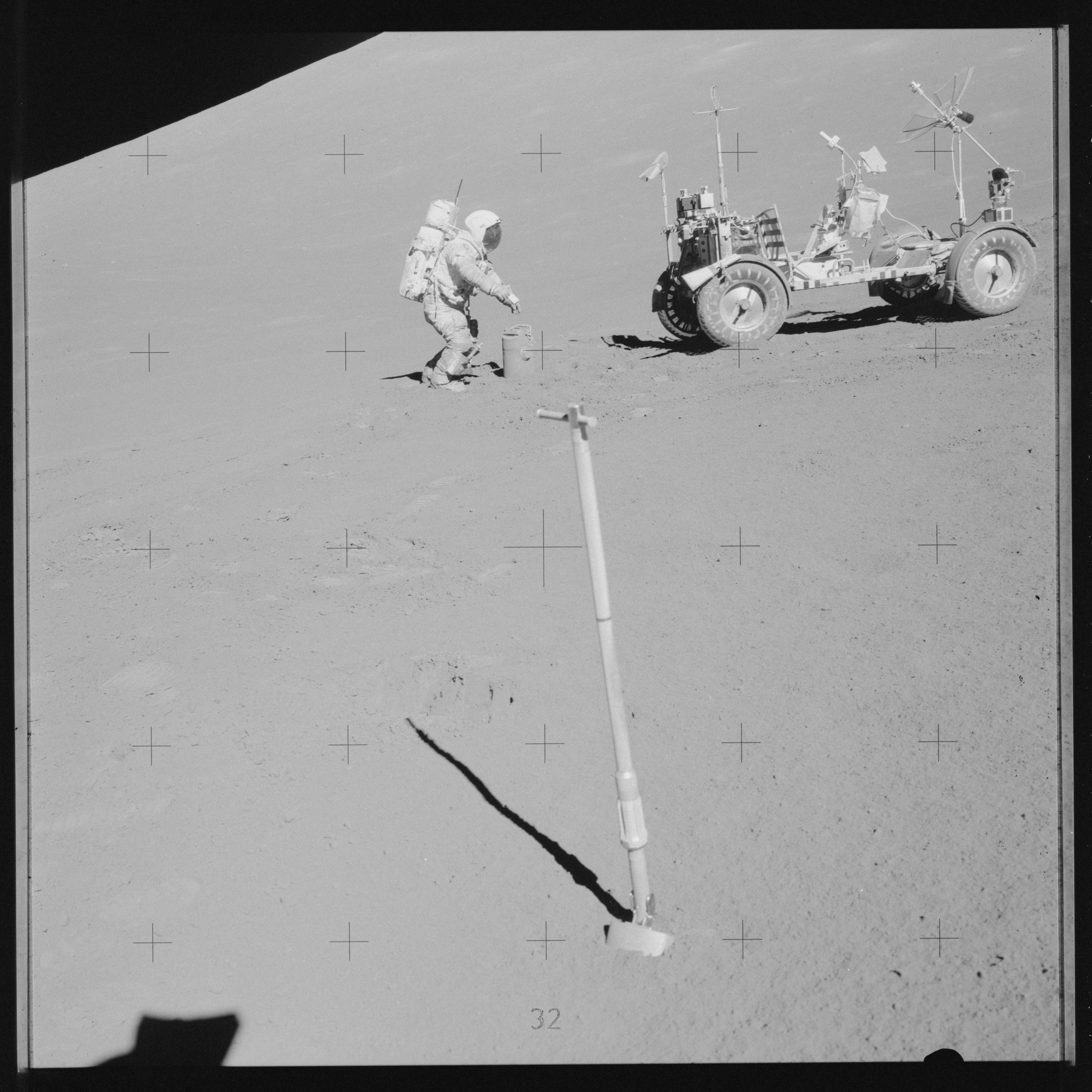
Traverse Gravimeter Experiment deployed off the rover by Gene Cernan, during EVA 3 at Station 8 at the base of the Sculptured Hills, Taurus-Littrow Valley.

Measurements with the Lunar Traverse Gravimeter were taken in two types of deployment: where the gravimeter was mounted onto the back of the Lunar Roving Vehicle and where the gravimeter was placed on the lunar surface. The instrument was required to be operated within 15 degrees of vertical to facilitate leveling of the sensor. Measurement with the device took approximately three minutes, during which the experiment could not be disturbed. Measurements taken on the Moon would be compared to readings taken on Earth to arrive a relative measure of the Moon's gravity.

A handle at the top of the instrument facilitated manual carrying of the instrument and three feet on the bottom of the device allowed the device to be placed directly onto the Moon's regolith. To regulate the devices temperature, when not in use on the lunar surface, the device would be placed in the shade with the radiator left open, emissively rejecting heat into space. The instrument was capable of providing a readout of the measured gravity within two minutes.

== Science ==
The instrument collected 26 readings in total during the Apollo 17 mission. Three instrument readings were taken to establish the thermal state of the instrument, once at the beginning of each EVA with no gravity readings collected. Measurements were taken in two different positional states to help "normal" other measurements. This included measurement with the instrument upside down and both on and off the lunar roving vehicle. 6 measurements were taken at the Lunar module landing site with 11 measurements taken at a variety of locations during the missions 3 EVA's. Two locations also had repeat measurements taken with the instrument off the Lunar Roving Vehicle. The 25th measurement may have been disrupted due to a pallet swinging open and causing issues with the instrument.

=== Results ===
The experiment found that the Lunar Module landing site had a gravity value of 162694.6 ± 5 mgal. The edges of the valley proximal to the landing site had gravity values around 25 mgal lower than the landing site. These results with interpreted to represent a 1km thick layer of volcanic basalt infilling the valley. This basalt was estimated to have a density that was 0.8g/cm^{3} greater than the surrounding valley walls. It was found that the instrument was particularly sensitive to impacts when the instrument was removed from the lunar rover and place on the lunar surface. These would produce notable shifts in the readings the instrument would provide and the effect was cumulative.
