= Apollo 11 =

First crewed Moon landing (1969)

- Buzz Aldrin on the Moon in a photograph taken by Neil Armstrong, who can be seen in the visor reflection along with Earth, the Lunar Module Eagle, and the U.S. flag
- Mission type: Crewed lunar landing (G)
- Operator: NASA
- COSPAR ID: CSM: 1969-059A; LM: 1969-059C
- SATCAT no.: CSM: 4039; LM: 4041
- Mission duration: 8 days, 3 hours, 18 minutes, 35 seconds

Spacecraft properties
- Spacecraft: Apollo CSM-107; Apollo LM-5
- Manufacturer: CSM: North American Rockwell; LM: Grumman
- Launch mass: 109,646 lb (49,735 kg)
- Landing mass: 10,873 lb (4,932 kg)

Crew
- Crew size: 3
- Members: Neil Armstrong; Michael Collins; Buzz Aldrin
- Callsign: CSM: Columbia; LM: Eagle; On surface: Tranquility Base

Start of mission
- Launch date: July 16, 1969, 13:32:00 UTC (9:32:00 am EDT)
- Rocket: Saturn V SA-506
- Launch site: Kennedy, LC‑39A

End of mission
- Recovered by: USS Hornet
- Landing date: July 24, 1969, 16:50:35 UTC
- Landing site: North Pacific Ocean; (13°19′N 169°9′W)

Orbital parameters
- Reference system: Selenocentric
- Periselene altitude: 100.9 km (54.5 nmi; 62.7 mi)
- Aposelene altitude: 122.4 km (66.1 nmi; 76.1 mi)
- Inclination: 1.25°
- Period: 2 hours
- Epoch: July 19, 1969, 21:44 UTC

Lunar orbiter
- Spacecraft component: Apollo command and service module
- Orbital insertion: July 19, 1969, 17:21:50 UTC
- Orbital departure: July 22, 1969, 04:55:42 UTC
- Orbits: 30

Lunar lander
- Spacecraft component: Apollo Lunar Module
- Landing date: July 20, 1969, 20:17:40 UTC
- Return launch: July 21, 1969, 17:54:00 UTC
- Landing site: Tranquility Base, Mare Tranquillitatis; (0.67416°N 23.47314°E)
- Sample mass: 47.51 lb (21.55 kg)
- Surface EVAs: 1
- EVA duration: 2 hours, 31 minutes, 40 seconds

Docking with Lunar Module
- Docking date: July 16, 1969, 16:56:03 UTC
- Undocking date: July 20, 1969, 17:44:00 UTC
- Time docked: 96 hours, 47 minutes, 57 seconds

Docking with Lunar Module ascent stage
- Docking date: July 21, 1969, 21:35:00 UTC
- Undocking date: July 21, 1969, 23:41:31 UTC
- Time docked: 2 hours, 6 minutes, 31 seconds
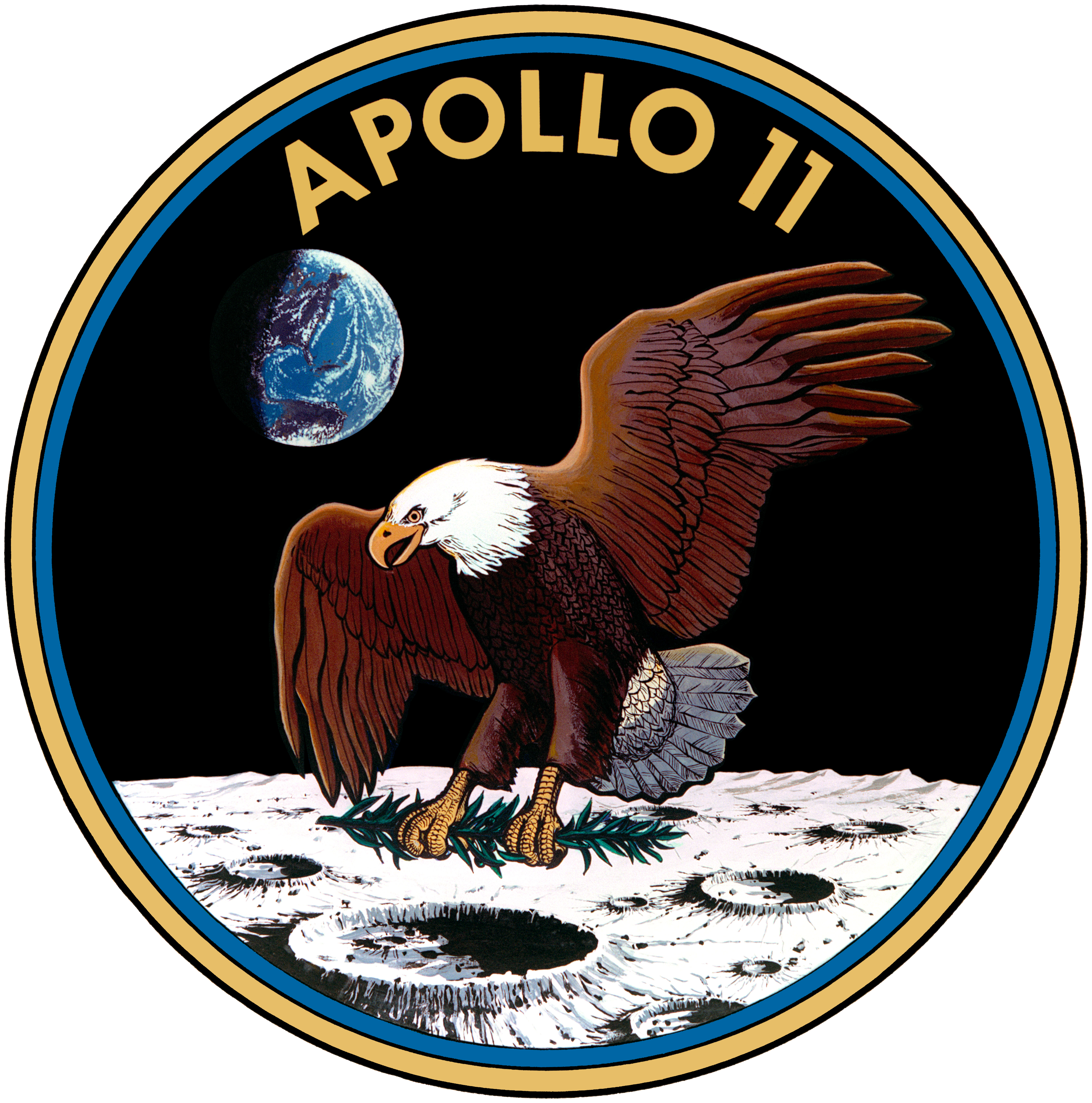
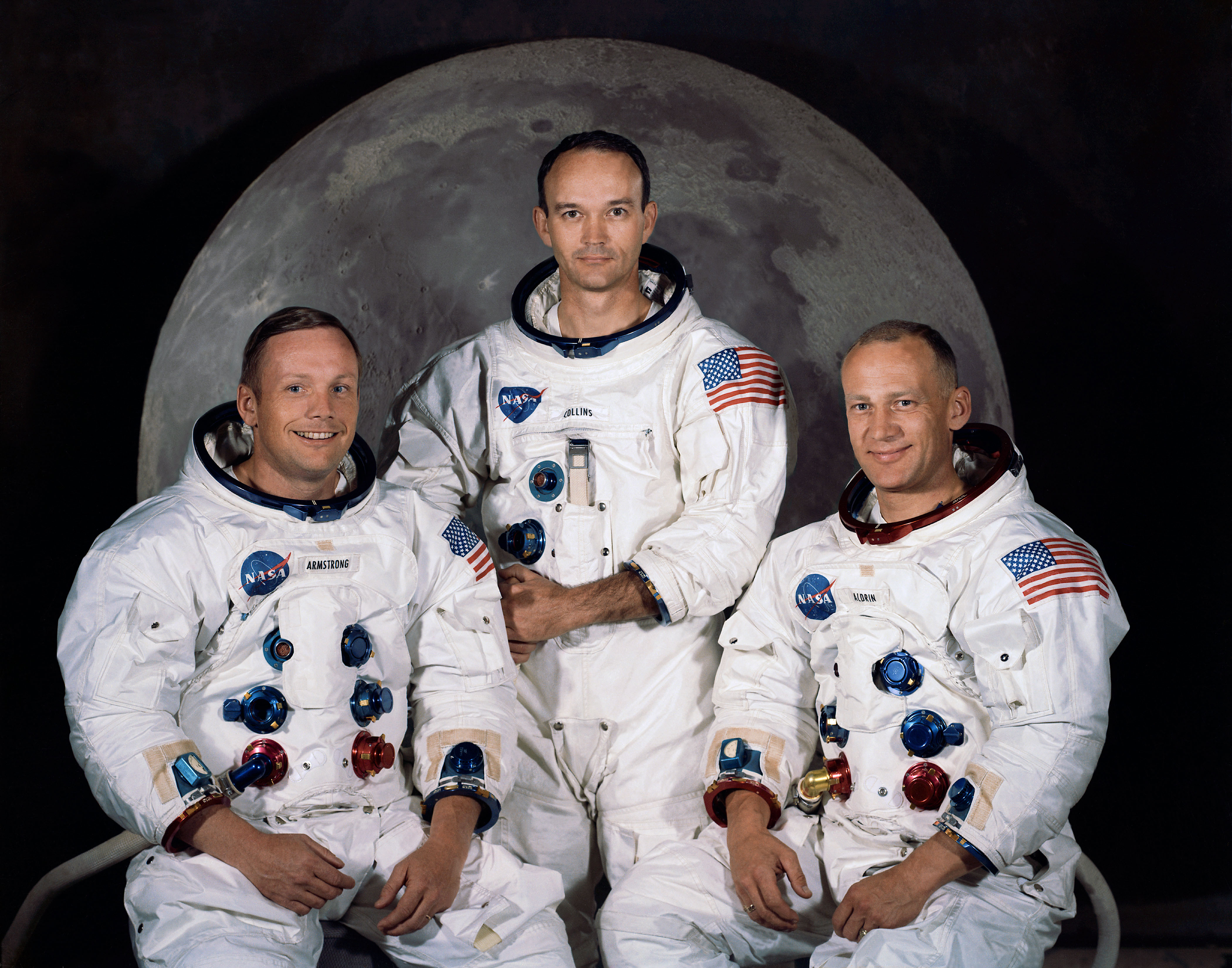
- Mission insignia Left to right: Armstrong, Collins, and Aldrin Apollo program

Apollo 11 (July 16–24, 1969) was the American spaceflight that first landed humans on the Moon, and the fifth crewed mission of NASA's Apollo program. The mission was crewed by Commander Neil Armstrong, Command Module Pilot Michael Collins, and Lunar Module Pilot Edwin "Buzz" Aldrin, all of whom were on their second and final spaceflight.

Launched atop a Saturn V rocket from Kennedy Space Center in Florida on July 16 at 13:32 UTC, the Apollo spacecraft consisted of three parts: the command module (CM), which housed the three astronauts and was the only part to return to Earth; the service module (SM), which provided propulsion, electrical power, oxygen, and water to the command module; and the Lunar Module (LM), which had two stages—a descent stage with a large engine and fuel tanks for landing on the Moon, and a lighter ascent stage containing a cabin for two astronauts and a small engine to return them to lunar orbit. After a three-day transit, Armstrong and Aldrin descended to the surface aboard the LM Eagle, landing in the Sea of Tranquility (Mare Tranquillitatis) on July 20 at 20:17 UTC while Collins remained in lunar orbit aboard the CM Columbia. Armstrong became the first human to walk on the Moon approximately six hours after landing, followed by Aldrin nineteen minutes later. Together they spent around two and a half hours walking on the surface, planting an American flag, speaking with President Richard Nixon who was in the White House, deploying scientific instruments, and collecting 21.5 kg (47.5 lb) of lunar material. After more than 21 hours on the surface, they rejoined Collins in lunar orbit, and the crew returned safely to Earth on July 24, splashing down in the Pacific Ocean.

Apollo 11 was the culmination of the Space Race, a geopolitical competition between the United States and the Soviet Union rooted in Cold War rivalry. It fulfilled a national goal set by President John F. Kennedy in May 1961, who had challenged the United States to land a man on the Moon and return him safely before the end of the decade. The program overcame a severe setback with the fatal Apollo 1 launchpad fire in January 1967 and drew on technologies developed through the preceding Mercury and Gemini programs. The Soviet Union, despite early leads in spaceflight, was unable to match the Saturn V rocket, and its uncrewed lunar probe Luna 15 crashed on the Moon on July 21, while Neil Armstrong and Buzz Aldrin were still on the lunar surface.

Armstrong's moonwalk was broadcast live to an estimated 600 million viewers, roughly one-fifth of the world's population, making it among the most-watched television events in history. Stepping onto the lunar surface, Armstrong declared: "That's one small step for [a] man, one giant leap for mankind." Lunar samples returned by the mission led to the identification of three previously unrecognized minerals, and scientific instruments deployed on the surface continued returning data for years afterwards. The crew were honoured with ticker-tape parades, a world goodwill tour, and the Presidential Medal of Freedom. The command module Columbia is preserved at the National Air and Space Museum in Washington, D.C., while the descent stage of Eagle remains on the lunar surface.

== Background ==
In the late 1950s and early 1960s, the United States was engaged in the Cold War, a geopolitical rivalry with the Soviet Union. On October 4, 1957, the Soviet Union launched Sputnik 1, the first artificial satellite, surprising the world and fueling fears about Soviet technological and military capabilities. Its success demonstrated that the USSR could potentially deliver nuclear weapons over intercontinental distances, challenging American claims of military, economic, and technological superiority.

This incident sparked the Sputnik crisis and ignited the Space Race, as both superpowers sought to demonstrate superiority in spaceflight. President Dwight D. Eisenhower responded to the challenge posed by Sputnik by creating the National Aeronautics and Space Administration (NASA), and initiating Project Mercury, which aimed to place a man into Earth orbit. The Soviets took the lead on April 12, 1961, when cosmonaut Yuri Gagarin became the first person in space and the first to orbit the Earth. Nearly a month later, on May 5, 1961, Alan Shepard became the first American in space; his 15-minute flight was suborbital, not a full orbit.

Because the Soviet Union had launch vehicles with higher lift capacity, President John F. Kennedy, Eisenhower's successor, chose a challenge that exceeded the capabilities of the existing generation of rockets, so that both countries would be starting from an equal position. A crewed mission to the Moon would serve this purpose.

On May 25, 1961, Kennedy addressed the United States Congress on "Urgent National Needs" and declared:

I believe that this nation should commit itself to achieving the goal, before this decade [1960s] is out, of landing a man on the Moon and returning him safely to the Earth. No single space project in this period will be more impressive to mankind, or more important for the long-range exploration of space; and none will be so difficult or expensive to accomplish. We propose to accelerate the development of the appropriate lunar space craft. We propose to develop alternate liquid and solid fuel boosters, much larger than any now being developed, until certain which is superior. We propose additional funds for other engine development and for unmanned explorations—explorations which are particularly important for one purpose which this nation will never overlook: the survival of the man who first makes this daring flight. But in a very real sense, it will not be one man going to the Moon—if we make this judgment affirmatively, it will be an entire nation. For all of us must work to put him there.

— Kennedy's speech to Congress

On September 12, 1962, Kennedy delivered another speech before a crowd of about 40,000 people in the Rice University football stadium in Houston, Texas. A widely quoted refrain from the middle portion of the speech reads as follows:

There is no strife, no prejudice, no national conflict in outer space as yet. Its hazards are hostile to us all. Its conquest deserves the best of all mankind, and its opportunity for peaceful cooperation may never come again. But why, some say, the Moon? Why choose this as our goal? And they may well ask, why climb the highest mountain? Why, 35 years ago, fly the Atlantic? Why does Rice play Texas? We choose to go to the Moon! We choose to go to the Moon ... We choose to go to the Moon in this decade and do the other things, not because they are easy, but because they are hard; because that goal will serve to organize and measure the best of our energies and skills, because that challenge is one that we are willing to accept, one we are unwilling to postpone, and one we intend to win, and the others, too.

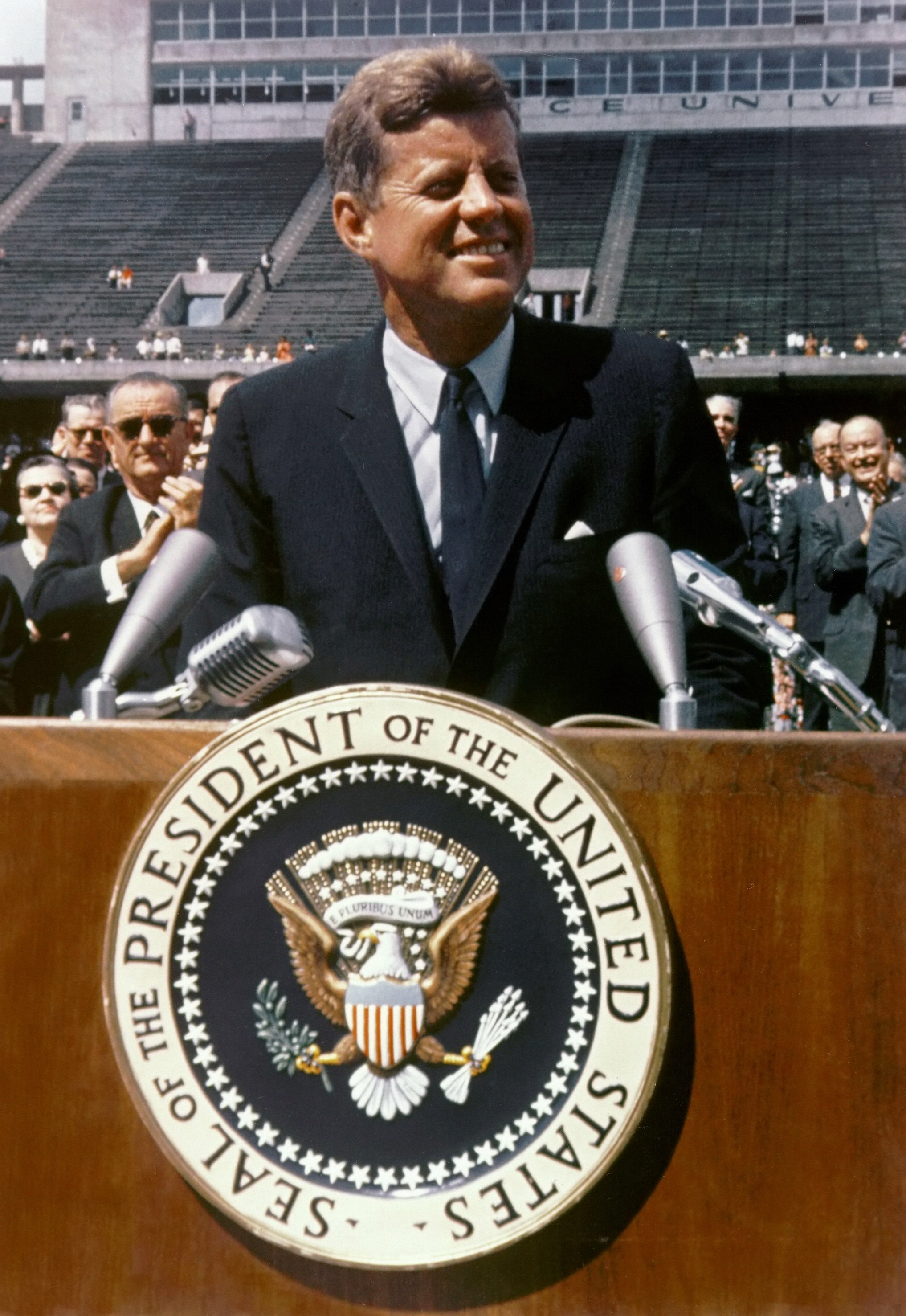
President John F. Kennedy speaking at Rice University on September 12, 1962

In spite of that, the proposed program faced widespread opposition and was dubbed a "moondoggle" by Norbert Wiener, a mathematician at the Massachusetts Institute of Technology. The effort to land a man on the Moon already had a name: Project Apollo. When Kennedy met with Nikita Khrushchev, the Premier of the Soviet Union in June 1961, he proposed making the Moon landing a joint project, but Khrushchev declined the offer. Kennedy again proposed a joint expedition to the Moon in a speech to the United Nations General Assembly on September 20, 1963. The idea of a joint Moon mission was ultimately abandoned after Kennedy's death.

An early and crucial decision was choosing lunar orbit rendezvous over both direct ascent and Earth orbit rendezvous. A space rendezvous is an orbital maneuver in which two spacecraft navigate through space and meet up. In July 1962, NASA head James Webb announced that lunar orbit rendezvous would be used and that the Apollo spacecraft would have three major parts: a command module (CM) with a cabin for the three astronauts, and the only part that returned to Earth; a service module (SM), which supported the command module with propulsion, electrical power, oxygen, and water; and a lunar module (LM) that had two stages—a descent stage for landing on the Moon, and an ascent stage to place the astronauts back into lunar orbit. This design meant the spacecraft could be launched by a single Saturn V rocket that was then under development.

Technologies and techniques required for Apollo were developed by Project Gemini. The Apollo project was enabled by NASA's adoption of new advances in semiconductor device, including metal–oxide–semiconductor field-effect transistors (MOSFETs) in the Interplanetary Monitoring Platform (IMP) and silicon integrated circuit (IC) chips in the Apollo Guidance Computer (AGC).

Project Apollo was abruptly halted by the Apollo 1 fire on January 27, 1967, in which astronauts Gus Grissom, Ed White, and Roger B. Chaffee died, and the subsequent investigation. In October 1968, Apollo 7 evaluated the command module in Earth orbit, and in December Apollo 8 tested it in lunar orbit. In March 1969, Apollo 9 put the lunar module through its paces in Earth orbit, and in May Apollo 10 conducted a "dress rehearsal" in lunar orbit. By July 1969, all was in readiness for Apollo 11 to take the final step onto the Moon.

The Soviet Union appeared to be winning the Space Race, but its early lead was overtaken by the US Gemini program and Soviet failure to develop the N1 launcher, which would have been comparable to the Saturn V. Seeing these failures, the Soviets then attempted to beat the US to return lunar material to the Earth by means of uncrewed probes. On July 13, three days before Apollo 11's launch, the Soviet Union launched Luna 15, which reached lunar orbit before Apollo 11. During descent, a malfunction caused Luna 15 to crash in Mare Crisium about two hours before Armstrong and Aldrin took off from the Moon's surface to return to earth. The Nuffield Radio Astronomy Laboratories radio telescope in England recorded transmissions from Luna 15 during its descent, and these were released in July 2009 for the 40th anniversary of Apollo 11.

== Personnel ==
=== Prime crew ===
Position	Astronaut
Commander	Neil Armstrong; Second and last spaceflight
Command Module Pilot	Michael Collins; Second and last spaceflight
Lunar Module Pilot	Edwin "Buzz" Aldrin Jr. Second and last spaceflight

The initial crew assignment of Commander Neil Armstrong, Command Module Pilot (CMP) Jim Lovell, and Lunar Module Pilot (LMP) Buzz Aldrin on the backup crew for Apollo 9 was officially announced on November 20, 1967. Lovell and Aldrin had previously flown together as the crew of Gemini 12. Due to design and manufacturing delays in the LM, Apollo 8 and Apollo 9 swapped prime and backup crews, and Armstrong's crew became the backup for Apollo 8. Based on the normal crew rotation scheme, Armstrong was then expected to command Apollo 11.

There would be one change. Michael Collins, the CMP on the Apollo 8 crew, began experiencing trouble with his legs. Doctors diagnosed a bony growth between his fifth and sixth vertebrae, requiring surgery. Lovell took his place on the Apollo 8 crew, and when Collins recovered he joined Armstrong's crew as CMP. In the meantime, Fred Haise filled in as backup LMP, and Aldrin as backup CMP for Apollo 8. Apollo 11 was the second American mission where all the crew members had prior spaceflight experience, the first being Apollo 10. The next was STS-26 in 1988.

Deke Slayton gave Armstrong the option to replace Aldrin with Lovell, since some thought Aldrin was difficult to work with. Armstrong had no issues working with Aldrin but thought it over for a day before declining. He thought Lovell deserved to command his own mission (eventually Apollo 13).

The Apollo 11 prime crew had none of the close cheerful camaraderie characterized by that of Apollo 12. Instead, they forged an amiable working relationship. Armstrong in particular was notoriously aloof, but Collins, who considered himself a loner, confessed to rebuffing Aldrin's attempts to create a more personal relationship. Aldrin and Collins described the crew as "amiable strangers". Armstrong did not agree with the assessment, and said "all the crews I was on worked very well together."

=== Backup crew ===
Position	Astronaut
Commander	Jim Lovell
Command Module Pilot	William Anders
Lunar Module Pilot	Fred Haise

The backup crew consisted of Lovell as Commander, William Anders as CMP, and Haise as LMP. Anders had flown with Lovell on Apollo 8. In early 1969, Anders accepted a job with the National Aeronautics and Space Council effective August 1969, and announced he would retire as an astronaut at that time. Ken Mattingly was moved from the support crew into parallel training with Anders as backup CMP in case Apollo 11 was delayed past its intended July launch date, at which point Anders would be unavailable.

Under the normal Apollo crew rotation, Lovell, Mattingly, and Haise would have been assigned to Apollo 14. However, because Alan Shepard had only recently returned to flight status and needed additional training, NASA reassigned his crew to Apollo 14 and moved Lovell's crew up to fly Apollo 13 instead. (Note: The role of the backup crew was to train and be prepared to fly in the event something happened to the prime crew. Backup crews, according to the rotation, were assigned as the prime crew three missions after their assignment of backups.) Shortly before launch, Mattingly was replaced by Jack Swigert due to concerns over possible measles exposure.

=== Support crew ===
During Projects Mercury and Gemini, each mission had a prime and a backup crew. For Apollo, NASA added a third group, the support crew. Their job was to maintain the flight plan, checklists, and mission rules, and to keep the prime and backup crews updated on any changes. They also developed procedures—especially for emergencies, so that by the time the prime and backup crews entered the simulators, they could focus on practicing and mastering them. The support crew for Apollo 11 was Mattingly, Ronald Evans, and Bill Pogue.

=== Capsule communicators ===
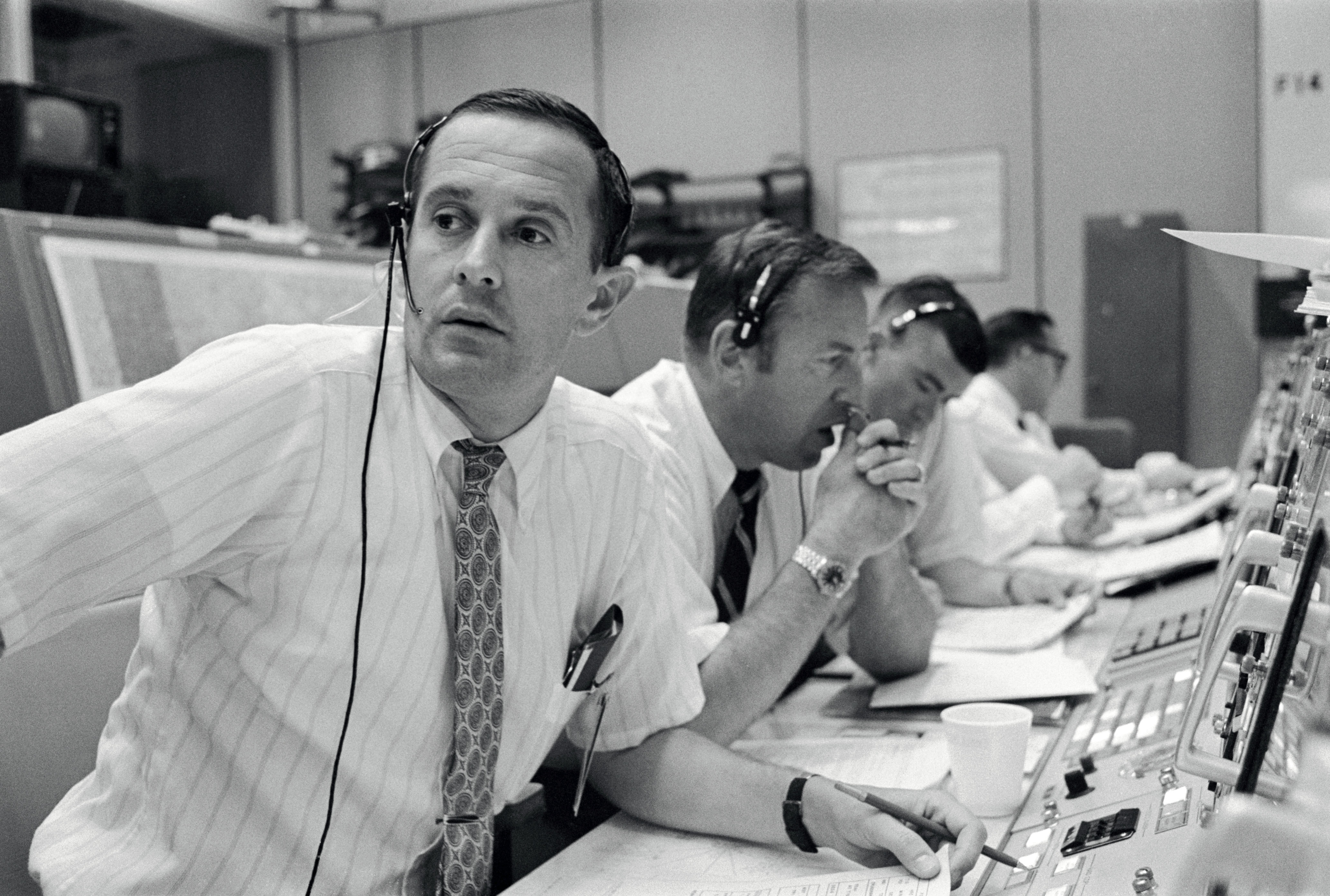
CAPCOM Charles Duke (left), with backup crewmembers Lovell and Haise listening in during Apollo 11's descent

The capsule communicator (CAPCOM) was an astronaut stationed at the Mission Control Center in Houston, Texas, and was typically the only person permitted to communicate directly with the flight crew. This practice ensured that messages came from someone best able to understand the situation in the spacecraft and to relay guidance from flight controllers as clearly as possible. For Apollo 11, the CAPCOMs were backup and support crew members Anders, Evans, Haise, Lovell, and Mattingly, along with Charles Duke, Owen Garriott, Don L. Lind, Bruce McCandless II, and Harrison Schmitt.

=== Flight directors ===
The flight directors for this mission were:

Apollo 11 flight directors
Name	Shift	Team	Activities
Clifford E. Charlesworth	1	Green	Launch and extravehicular activity (EVA)
Gerald D. Griffin	1	Gold	Backup for shift 1
Gene Kranz	2	White	Lunar landing
Glynn Lunney	3	Black	Lunar ascent
Milton Windler	4	Maroon	Planning

=== Other key personnel ===
Other key personnel who played important roles in the Apollo 11 mission include the following.

Other personnel
Name	Activities
Farouk El-Baz	Geologist, studied geology of the Moon, identified landing locations, trained pilots
Kurt Debus	Rocket scientist, supervised construction of launch pads and infrastructure
Jamye Flowers	Secretary for astronauts
Eleanor Foraker	Tailor who designed space suits
Jack Garman	Computer engineer and technician
Millicent Goldschmidt	Microbiologist who designed aseptic lunar material collection techniques and trained astronauts
Eldon C. Hall	Apollo Guidance Computer hardware designer
Margaret Hamilton	Onboard flight computer software engineer
Milton E. Harr	Geotechnical engineer who designed the footpads for the Apollo Lunar Module
John Houbolt	Route planner
Gene Shoemaker	Geologist who trained astronauts in field geology
Bill Tindall	Coordinated mission techniques

== Preparations ==
=== Insignia ===
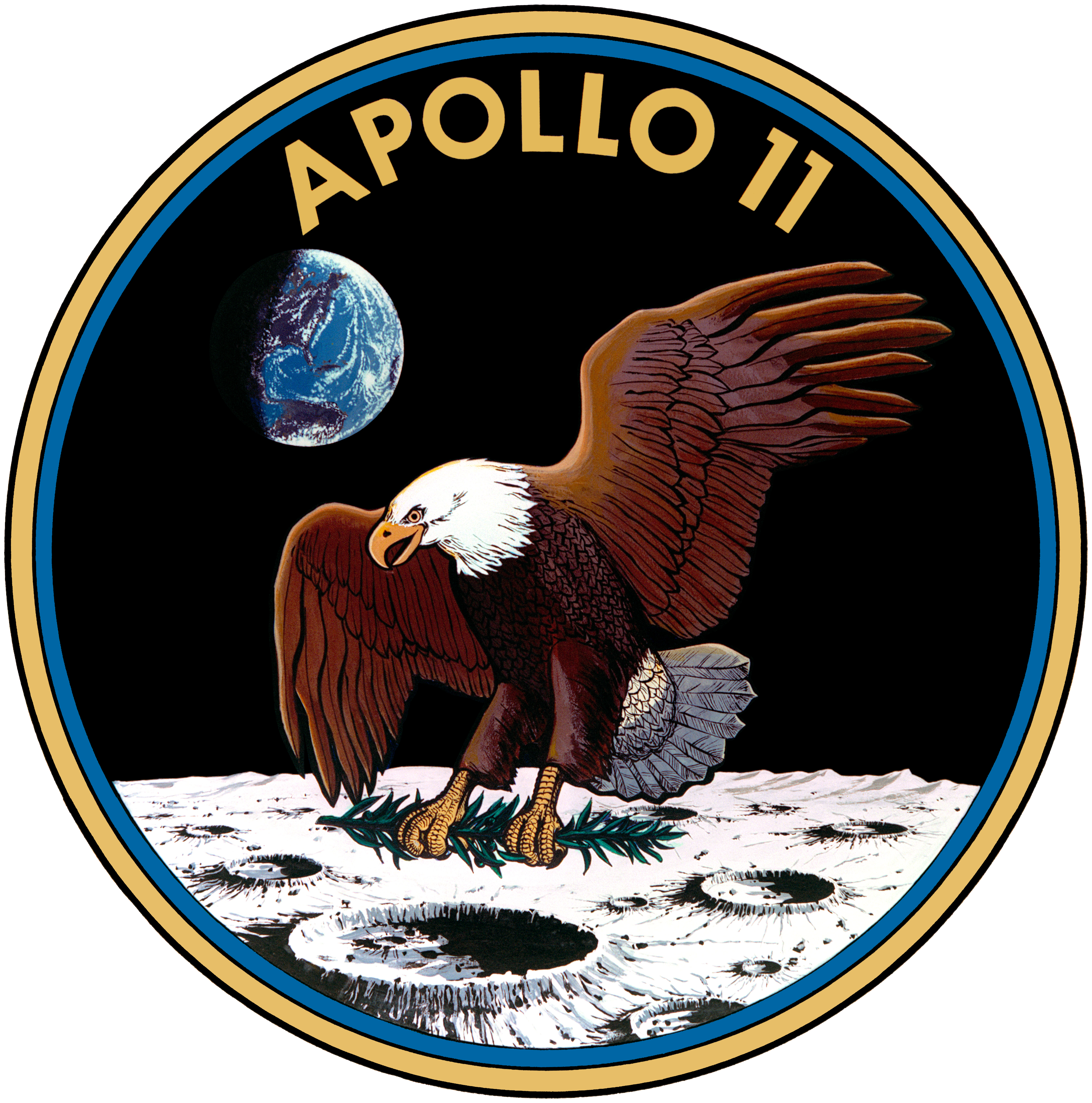
The Apollo 11 insignia. The eagle is carrying an olive branch to represent a peaceful mission

The Apollo 11 mission emblem was designed by Collins, who wanted a symbol for "peaceful lunar landing by the United States". At Lovell's suggestion, he chose the bald eagle, the national bird of the United States, as the symbol. Tom Wilson, a simulator instructor, suggested an olive branch in its beak to represent their peaceful mission. Collins added a lunar background with the Earth in the distance. The sunlight in the image was coming from the wrong direction; the shadow should have been in the lower part of the Earth instead of the left.

Aldrin, Armstrong and Collins decided the Eagle and the Moon would be in their natural colors, and decided on a blue and gold border. Armstrong was concerned that "eleven" would not be understood by non-English speakers, so they went with "Apollo 11", and they decided not to put their names on the patch, so it would "be representative of everyone who had worked toward a lunar landing".

An illustrator at the Manned Spacecraft Center (MSC) did the artwork, which was then sent off to NASA officials for approval. The design was rejected. Bob Gilruth, the director of the MSC felt the talons of the eagle looked "too warlike". After some discussion, the olive branch was moved to the talons. When the Eisenhower dollar coin was released in 1971, the patch design provided the eagle for its reverse side. The design was also used for the smaller Susan B. Anthony dollar unveiled in 1979.

=== Call signs ===
The original cockpit of the command module (CM) with three seats, photographed from above. It is located in the National Air and Space Museum. The very high resolution image was produced in 2007 by the Smithsonian Institution.

After the crew of Apollo 10 named their spacecraft Charlie Brown and Snoopy, assistant manager for public affairs Julian Scheer wrote to George Low, the Manager of the Apollo Spacecraft Program Office at the MSC, to suggest the Apollo 11 crew be less flippant in naming their craft. The name Snowcone was used for the CM and Haystack was used for the LM in both internal and external communications during early mission planning.

The LM was named Eagle after the motif which was featured prominently on the mission insignia. At Scheer's suggestion, the CM was named Columbia after Columbiad, the giant cannon that launched a spacecraft (also from Florida) in Jules Verne's 1865 novel From the Earth to the Moon. It also referred to Columbia, a historical name of the United States. In Collins' 1976 book, he said Columbia was in reference to Christopher Columbus.

=== Mementos ===
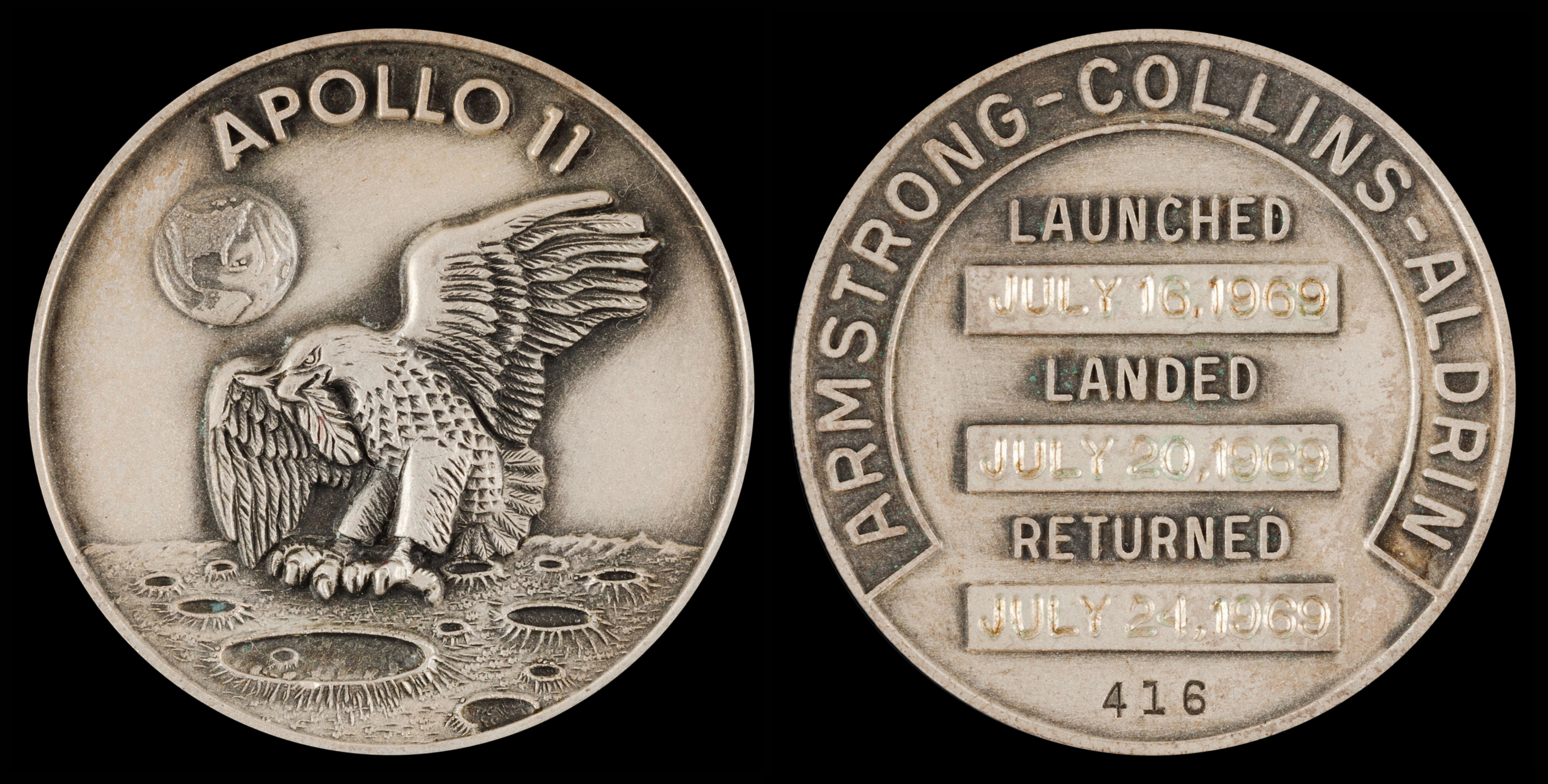
Apollo 11 space-flown silver Robbins medallion

The astronauts had personal preference kits (PPKs), small bags containing personal items of significance they wanted to take with them on the mission. Five 0.5-pound (0.23 kg) PPKs were carried on Apollo 11: three (one for each astronaut) were stowed on Columbia before launch, and two on Eagle.

Neil Armstrong's LM PPK contained a piece of wood from the Wright brothers' 1903 Wright Flyer's left propeller and a piece of fabric from its wing, along with a diamond-studded astronaut pin originally given to Slayton by the widows of the Apollo 1 crew. This pin had been intended to be flown on that mission and given to Slayton afterwards, but following the disastrous launch pad fire and subsequent funerals, the widows gave the pin to Slayton. Armstrong took it with him on Apollo 11.

=== Site selection ===
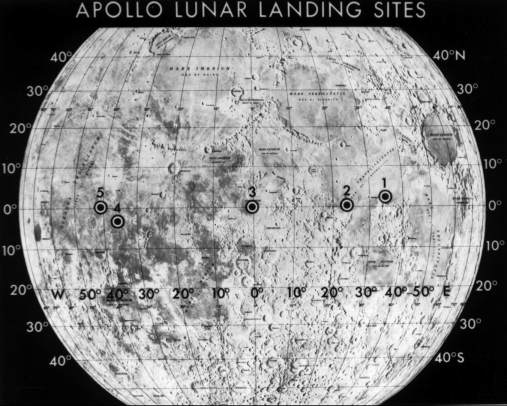
A map of the Moon showing prospective landing sites for Apollo 11. Site 2 in the Sea of Tranquility was chosen.

NASA's Apollo Site Selection Board announced five potential landing sites on February 8, 1968. These were the result of two years' worth of studies based on high-resolution photography of the lunar surface by the five uncrewed probes of the Lunar Orbiter program and information about surface conditions provided by the Surveyor program. The best Earth-bound telescopes could not resolve features with the resolution Project Apollo required. The landing site had to be close to the lunar equator to minimize the amount of propellant required, clear of obstacles to minimize maneuvering, and flat to simplify the task of the landing radar. Scientific value was not a consideration.

Areas that appeared promising on photographs taken on Earth were often found to be totally unacceptable. The original requirement that the site be free of craters had to be relaxed, as no such site was found. Five sites were considered: Sites 1 and 2 were in the Sea of Tranquility (Mare Tranquillitatis); Site 3 was in the Central Bay (Sinus Medii); and Sites 4 and 5 were in the Ocean of Storms (Oceanus Procellarum). The final site selection was based on seven criteria:

- The site needed to be smooth, with relatively few craters;
- with approach paths free of large hills, tall cliffs or deep craters that might confuse the landing radar and cause it to issue incorrect readings;
- reachable with a minimum amount of propellant;
- allowing for delays in the launch countdown;
- providing the Apollo spacecraft with a free-return trajectory, one that would allow it to coast around the Moon and safely return to Earth without requiring any engine firings should a problem arise on the way to the Moon;
- with good visibility during the landing approach, meaning the Sun would be between 7 and 20 degrees behind the LM; and
- a general slope of less than two degrees in the landing area.

The requirement for the Sun angle was particularly restrictive, limiting the launch date to one day per month. A landing just after dawn was chosen to limit the temperature extremes the astronauts would experience. The Apollo Site Selection Board selected Site 2, with Sites 3 and 5 as backups in the event of the launch being delayed. In May 1969, Apollo 10's lunar module flew to within 15 kilometers (9.3 mi) of Site 2, and reported it was acceptable.

=== First-step decision ===
During the first press conference after the Apollo 11 crew was announced, the first question was, "Which one of you gentlemen will be the first man to step onto the lunar surface?" Slayton told the reporter it had not been decided, and Armstrong added that it was "not based on individual desire".

One of the first versions of the egress checklist had the lunar module pilot exit the spacecraft before the commander, which matched what had been done on Gemini missions, where the commander had never performed the spacewalk. Reporters wrote in early 1969 that Aldrin would be the first man to walk on the Moon, and Associate Administrator George Mueller told reporters he would be first as well. Aldrin heard that Armstrong would be the first because Armstrong was a civilian, which made Aldrin livid. Aldrin attempted to persuade other Lunar Module pilots he should be first, but they responded cynically about what they perceived as a lobbying campaign. Attempting to stem interdepartmental conflict, Slayton told Aldrin that Armstrong would be first since he was the commander. The decision was announced in a press conference on April 14, 1969.

For decades, Aldrin believed the final decision was largely driven by the Lunar Module's hatch location. Because the astronauts had their spacesuits on and the spacecraft was so small, maneuvering to exit the spacecraft was difficult. The crew tried a simulation in which Aldrin left the spacecraft first, but he damaged the simulator while attempting to egress. While this was enough for mission planners to make their decision, Aldrin and Armstrong were left in the dark on the decision until late spring. Slayton told Armstrong the plan was to have him leave the spacecraft first, if he agreed. Armstrong said, "Yes, that's the way to do it."

The media accused Armstrong of exercising his commander's prerogative to exit the spacecraft first. Chris Kraft revealed in his 2001 autobiography that a meeting occurred between Gilruth, Slayton, Low, and himself to make sure Aldrin would not be the first to walk on the Moon. They argued that the first person to walk on the Moon should be like Charles Lindbergh, a calm and quiet person. They made the decision to change the flight plan so the commander was the first to egress from the spacecraft.

=== Pre-launch ===
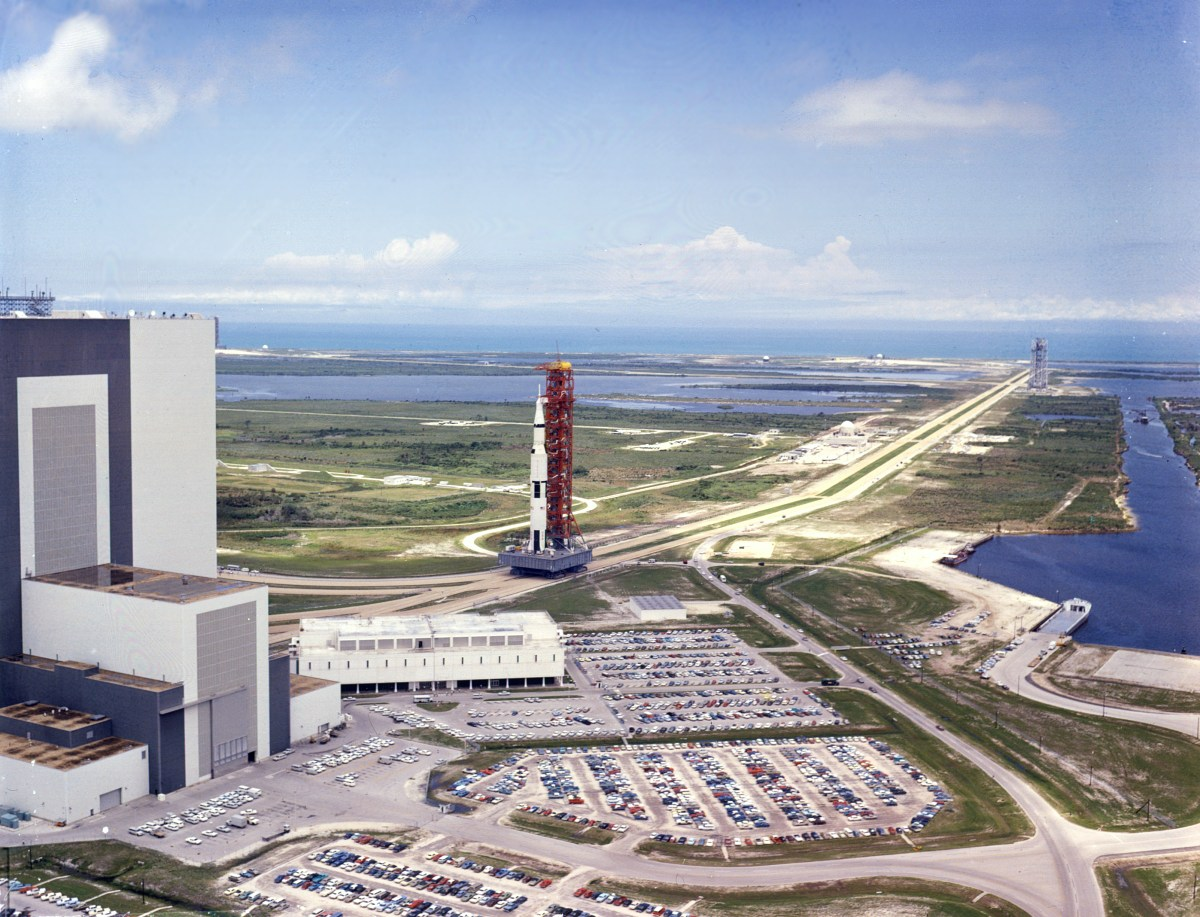
Saturn V SA-506, the rocket carrying the Apollo 11 spacecraft, moves out of the Vehicle Assembly Building towards Launch Complex 39.

The ascent stage of LM-5 Eagle arrived at the Kennedy Space Center on January 8, 1969, followed by the descent stage four days later, and CSM-107 Columbia on January 23. There were several differences between Eagle and Apollo 10's LM-4 Snoopy; Eagle had a VHF radio antenna to facilitate communication with the astronauts during their EVA on the lunar surface; a lighter ascent engine; more thermal protection on the landing gear; and a package of scientific experiments known as the Early Apollo Scientific Experiments Package (EASEP). The only change in the configuration of the command module was the removal of some insulation from the forward hatch. The CSM was mated on January 29, and moved from the Operations and Checkout Building to the Vehicle Assembly Building on April 14.

The S-IVB third stage of Saturn V AS-506 had arrived on January 18, followed by the S-II second stage on February 6, S-IC first stage on February 20, and the Saturn V Instrument Unit on February 27. At 12:30 on May 20, the 5,443-tonne (5,357-long-ton; 6,000-short-ton) assembly departed the Vehicle Assembly Building atop the crawler-transporter, bound for Launch Pad 39A, part of Launch Complex 39, while Apollo 10 was still on its way to the Moon. A countdown test commenced on June 26, and concluded on July 2. The launch complex was floodlit on the night of July 15, when the crawler-transporter carried the mobile service structure back to its parking area. In the early hours of the morning, the fuel tanks of the S-II and S-IVB stages were filled with liquid hydrogen. Fueling was completed by three hours before launch. Launch operations were partly automated, with 43 programs written in the ATOLL programming language.

Slayton roused the crew shortly after 04:00, and they showered, shaved, and had the traditional pre-flight breakfast of steak and eggs with Slayton and the backup crew. They then donned their space suits and began breathing pure oxygen. At 06:30, they headed out to Launch Complex 39. Haise entered Columbia about three hours and ten minutes before launch time. Along with a technician, he helped Armstrong into the left-hand couch at 06:54. Five minutes later, Collins joined him, taking up his position on the right-hand couch. Finally, Aldrin entered, taking the center couch. Haise left around two hours and ten minutes before launch. The closeout crew sealed the hatch, and the cabin was purged and pressurized. The closeout crew then left the launch complex about an hour before launch time. The countdown became automated at three minutes and twenty seconds before launch time. Over 450 personnel were at the consoles in the firing room.

== Mission ==
=== Launch and flight to lunar orbit ===
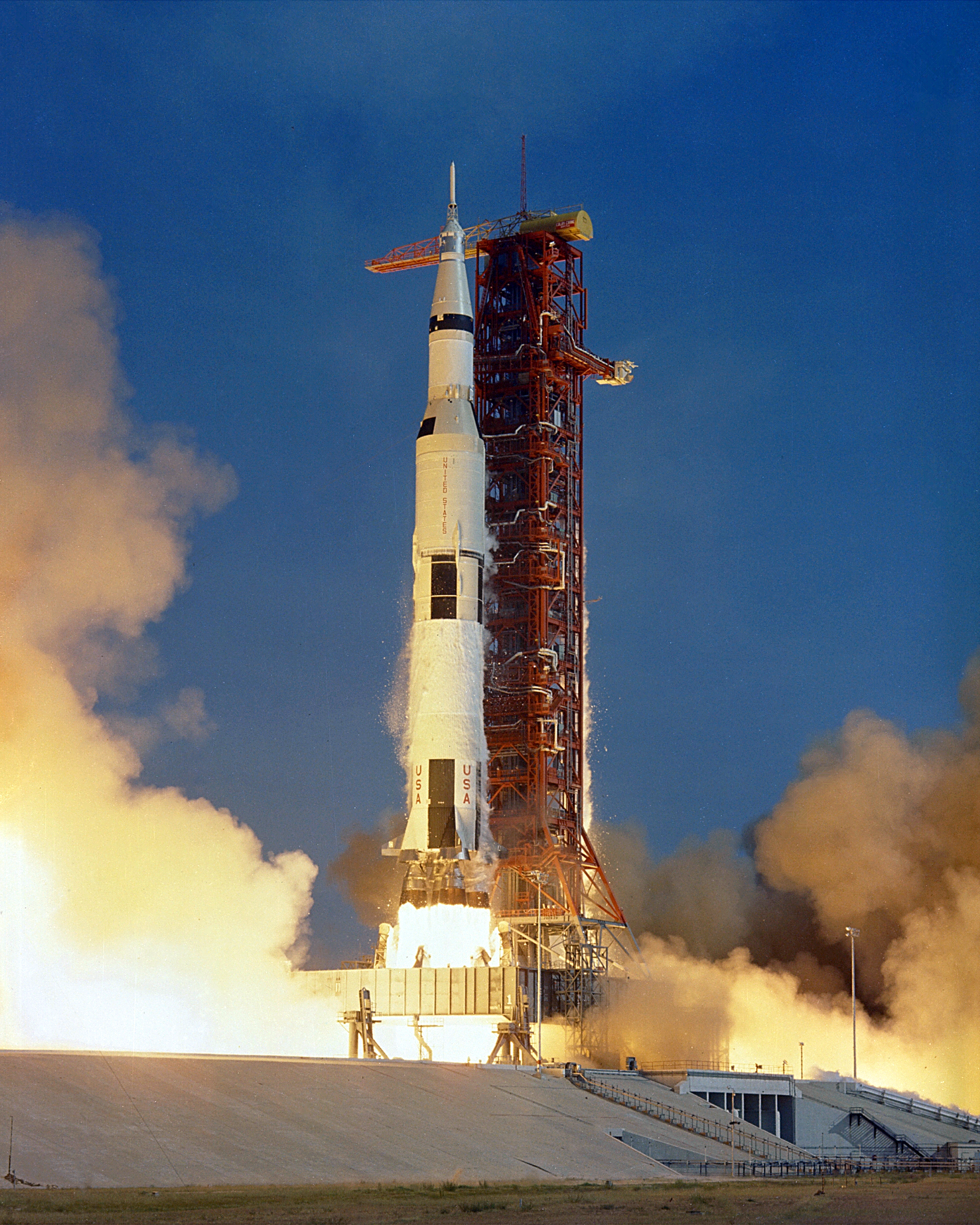
The Apollo 11 Saturn V space vehicle lifts off with astronauts Neil A. Armstrong, Michael Collins and Edwin E. Aldrin Jr. at 9:32 am. EDT July 16, 1969, from Kennedy Space Center's Launch Complex 39A.

An estimated one million spectators watched the launch of Apollo 11 from the highways and beaches in the vicinity of the launch site. Dignitaries included the Chief of Staff of the United States Army, General William Westmoreland, four cabinet members, 19 state governors, 40 mayors, 60 ambassadors and 200 congressmen. Vice President Spiro Agnew viewed the launch with former president Lyndon B. Johnson and his wife Lady Bird Johnson. Around 3,500 media representatives were present. About two-thirds were from the United States; the rest came from 55 other countries. The launch was televised live in 33 countries, with an estimated 25 million viewers in the United States alone. Millions more around the world listened to radio broadcasts. President Richard Nixon viewed the launch from his office in the White House with his NASA liaison officer, Apollo astronaut Frank Borman. Lodging near Cape Canaveral was reported as being booked months ahead in advance for the launch by a Florida newspaper.

Saturn V AS-506 launched Apollo 11 on July 16, 1969, at 13:32:00 UTC (9:32:00 EDT). At 13.2 seconds into the flight, the vehicle began to roll into its flight azimuth of 72.058°. Full shutdown of the first-stage engines occurred about 2 minutes and 42 seconds into the mission, followed by separation of the S-IC and ignition of the S-II engines. The second stage engines then cut off and separated at about 9 minutes and 8 seconds, allowing the first ignition of the S-IVB engine a few seconds later.

Apollo 11 entered a near-circular Earth orbit at an altitude of 100.4 nautical miles (185.9 km) by 98.9 nautical miles (183.2 km), twelve minutes into its flight. After one and a half orbits, which took around two and a half hours, a second ignition of the S-IVB engine pushed the spacecraft onto its trajectory toward the Moon with the trans-lunar injection (TLI) burn, which took about 5 minutes and 47 seconds and started at 16:16:16 UTC. About 30 minutes later, with Collins in the left seat and at the controls, the transposition, docking, and extraction maneuver was performed. This involved separating Columbia from the spent S-IVB stage, turning around, and docking with Eagle still attached to the stage. After the LM was extracted, the combined spacecraft headed for the Moon, while the rocket stage flew on a trajectory past the Moon. This was done to avoid the third stage colliding with the spacecraft, the Earth, or the Moon. A slingshot effect from passing around the Moon threw it into an orbit around the Sun.

On July 19 at 17:21:50 UTC, Apollo 11 passed behind the Moon and fired its service propulsion engine to enter lunar orbit. In the thirty orbits that followed, the crew saw passing views of their landing site in the southern Sea of Tranquility about 12 miles (19 km) southwest of the crater Sabine D. The site was selected in part because it had been characterized as relatively flat and smooth by the automated Ranger 8 and Surveyor 5 landers and the Lunar Orbiter mapping spacecraft, and because it was unlikely to present major landing or EVA challenges. It lay about 25 kilometers (16 mi) southeast of the Surveyor 5 landing site, and 68 kilometers (42 mi) southwest of Ranger 8's crash site.

=== Lunar descent ===
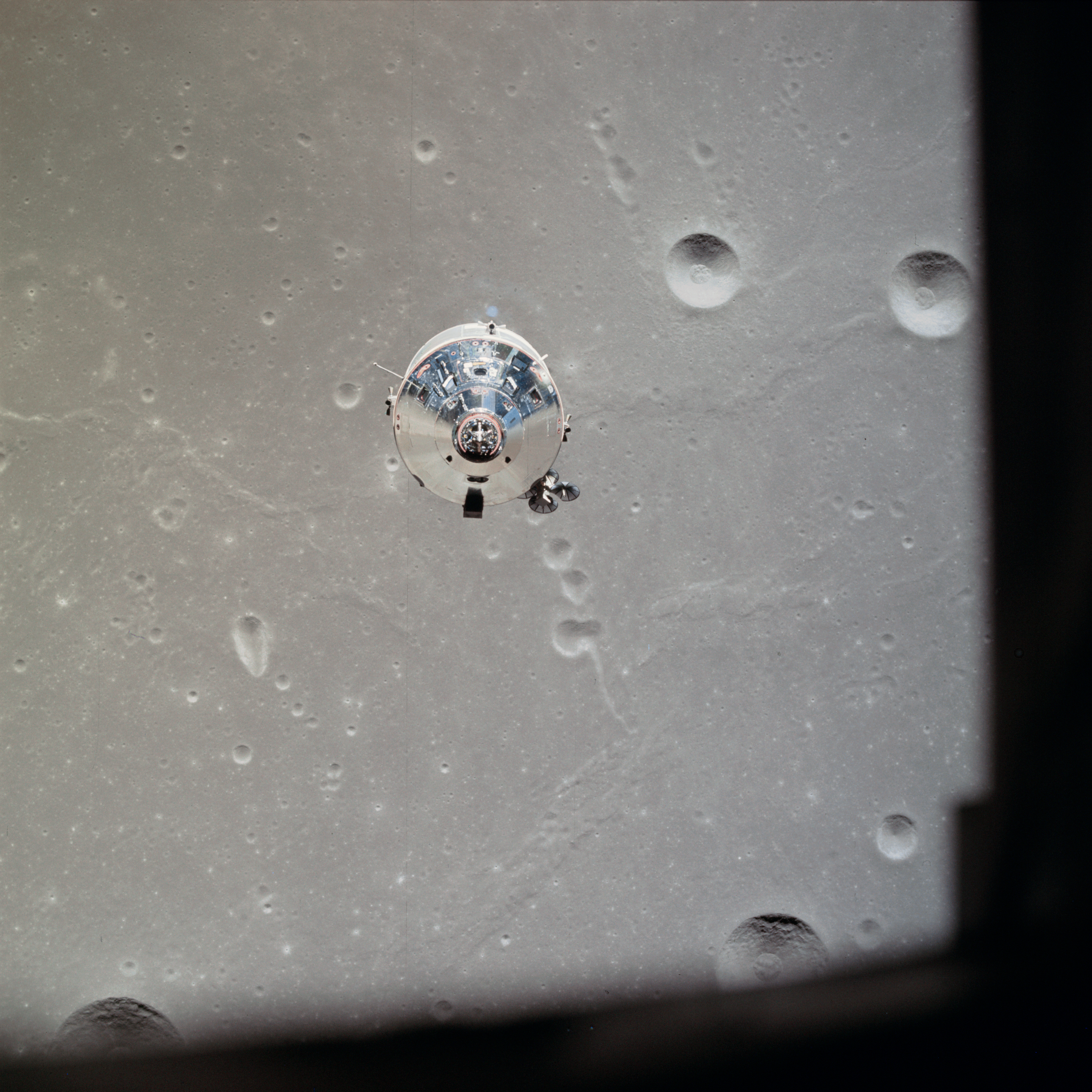
Columbia in lunar orbit, photographed from Eagle

At 12:52:00 UTC on July 20, Aldrin and Armstrong entered Eagle, and began the final preparations for lunar descent. At 17:44:00 Eagle separated from Columbia. Collins, alone aboard Columbia, inspected Eagle as it pirouetted before him to ensure the craft was not damaged, and that the landing gear was correctly deployed. Armstrong exclaimed: "The Eagle has wings!"

As the descent began, Armstrong and Aldrin found themselves passing landmarks on the surface two or three seconds early, and reported that they were "long"; they would land miles west of their target point. Eagle was traveling too fast. The problem could have been mascons—concentrations of high mass in a region or regions of the Moon's crust that contains a gravitational anomaly, potentially altering Eagle's trajectory. Flight Director Gene Kranz speculated that it could have resulted from extra air pressure in the docking tunnel, or a result of Eagle's pirouette maneuver.

Five minutes into the descent burn, and 6,000 feet (1,800 m) above the surface of the Moon, the LM guidance computer (LGC) distracted the crew with the first of several unexpected 1201 and 1202 program alarms. Inside Mission Control Center, computer engineer Jack Garman told Guidance Officer Steve Bales it was safe to continue the descent, and this was relayed to the crew. The program alarms indicated "executive overflows", meaning the guidance computer could not complete all its tasks in real-time and had to postpone some of them. Margaret Hamilton, the Director of Apollo Flight Computer Programming at the MIT Charles Stark Draper Laboratory later recalled:

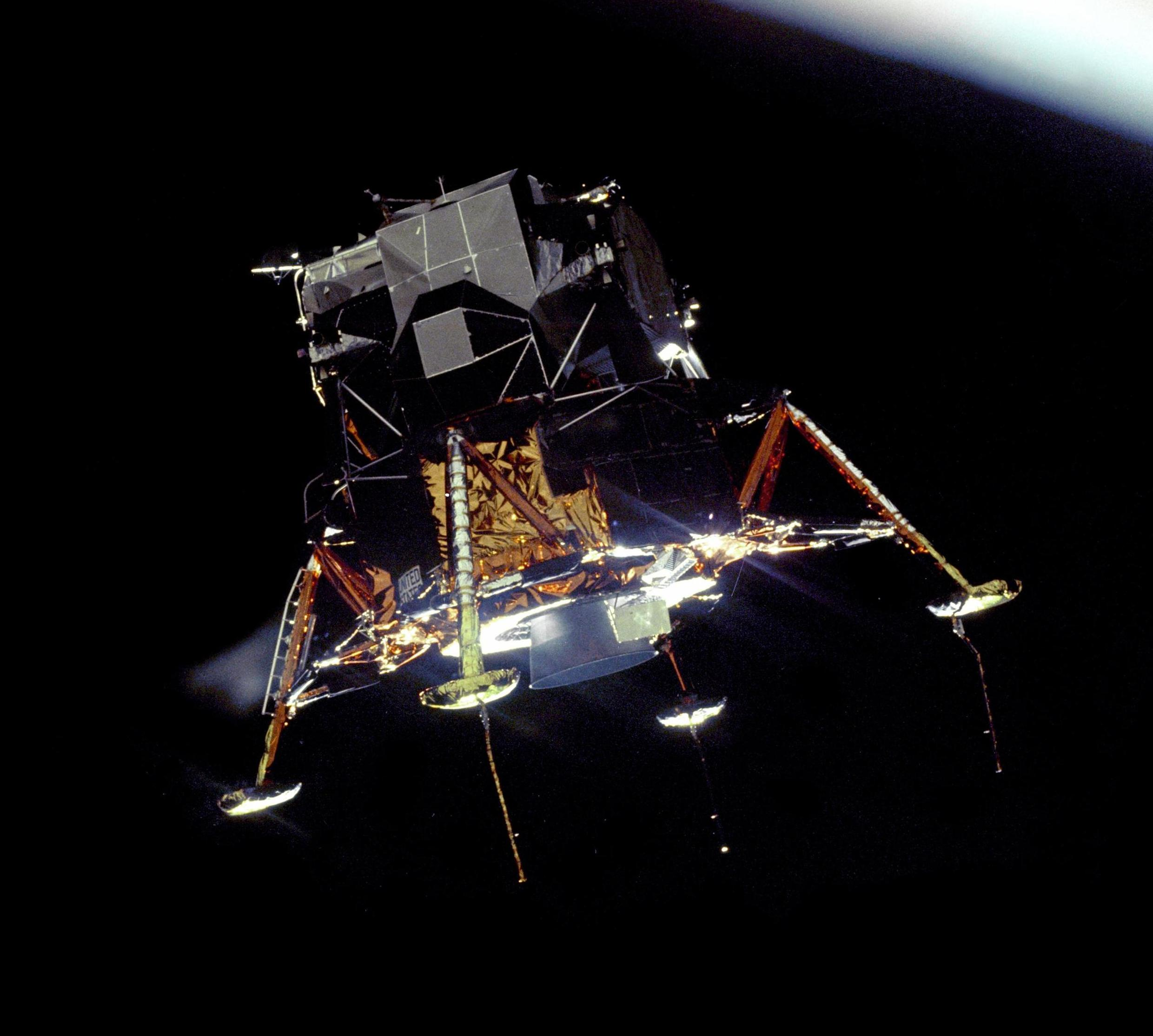
Eagle in lunar orbit photographed from Columbia

To blame the computer for the Apollo 11 problems is like blaming the person who spots a fire and calls the fire department. Actually, the computer was programmed to do more than recognize error conditions. A complete set of recovery programs was incorporated into the software. The software's action, in this case, was to eliminate lower priority tasks and re-establish the more important ones. The computer, rather than almost forcing an abort, prevented an abort. If the computer hadn't recognized this problem and taken recovery action, I doubt if Apollo 11 would have been the successful Moon landing it was.

During the mission, the cause was diagnosed as the rendezvous radar switch being in the wrong position, causing the computer to process data from both the rendezvous and landing radars at the same time. Software engineer Don Eyles concluded in a 2005 Guidance and Control Conference paper that the problem was due to a hardware design bug previously seen during testing of the first uncrewed LM in Apollo 5. Having the rendezvous radar on (so it was warmed up in case of an emergency landing abort) should have been irrelevant to the computer, but an electrical phasing mismatch between two parts of the rendezvous radar system could cause the stationary antenna to appear to the computer as dithering back and forth between two positions, depending upon how the hardware randomly powered up. The extra spurious cycle stealing, as the rendezvous radar updated an involuntary counter, caused the computer alarms.

=== Landing ===
Armstrong pilots Eagle to its landing on the Moon, July 20, 1969.

When Armstrong again looked outside, he saw that the computer's landing system was targeting a boulder-strewn area just north and east of a 300-foot-diameter (91 m) crater (later determined to be West crater), so he took semi-automatic control. Armstrong considered landing short of the boulder field so they could collect geological samples from it, but could not since their horizontal velocity was too high. Throughout the descent, Aldrin called out navigation data to Armstrong, who was busy piloting Eagle.

Armstrong found a clear patch of ground and maneuvered the spacecraft towards it. As he got closer, now 250 feet (76 m) above the surface, he discovered his new landing site had a crater in it. Now 107 feet (33 m) above the surface, Armstrong knew their propellant supply was dwindling and was determined to land at the first possible landing site. He cleared the crater and found another patch of level ground. They were now 100 feet (30 m) from the surface, with only 90 seconds of propellant remaining. Lunar dust kicked up by the LM's engine began to impair his ability to determine the spacecraft's motion. Some large rocks jutted out of the dust cloud, and Armstrong focused on them during his descent so he could determine the spacecraft's speed.

A light informed Aldrin that at least one of the 67-inch (170 cm) probes hanging from Eagle's footpads had touched the surface a few moments before the landing and he said: "Contact light!" Armstrong was supposed to immediately shut the engine down, as the engineers suspected the pressure caused by the engine's own exhaust reflecting off the lunar surface could make it explode, but he forgot. Three seconds later, Eagle landed and Armstrong shut the engine down. Aldrin immediately said "Okay, engine stop. ACA—out of detent." Armstrong acknowledged: "Out of detent. Auto." Aldrin continued: "Mode control—both auto. Descent engine command override off. Engine arm—off. 413 is in."

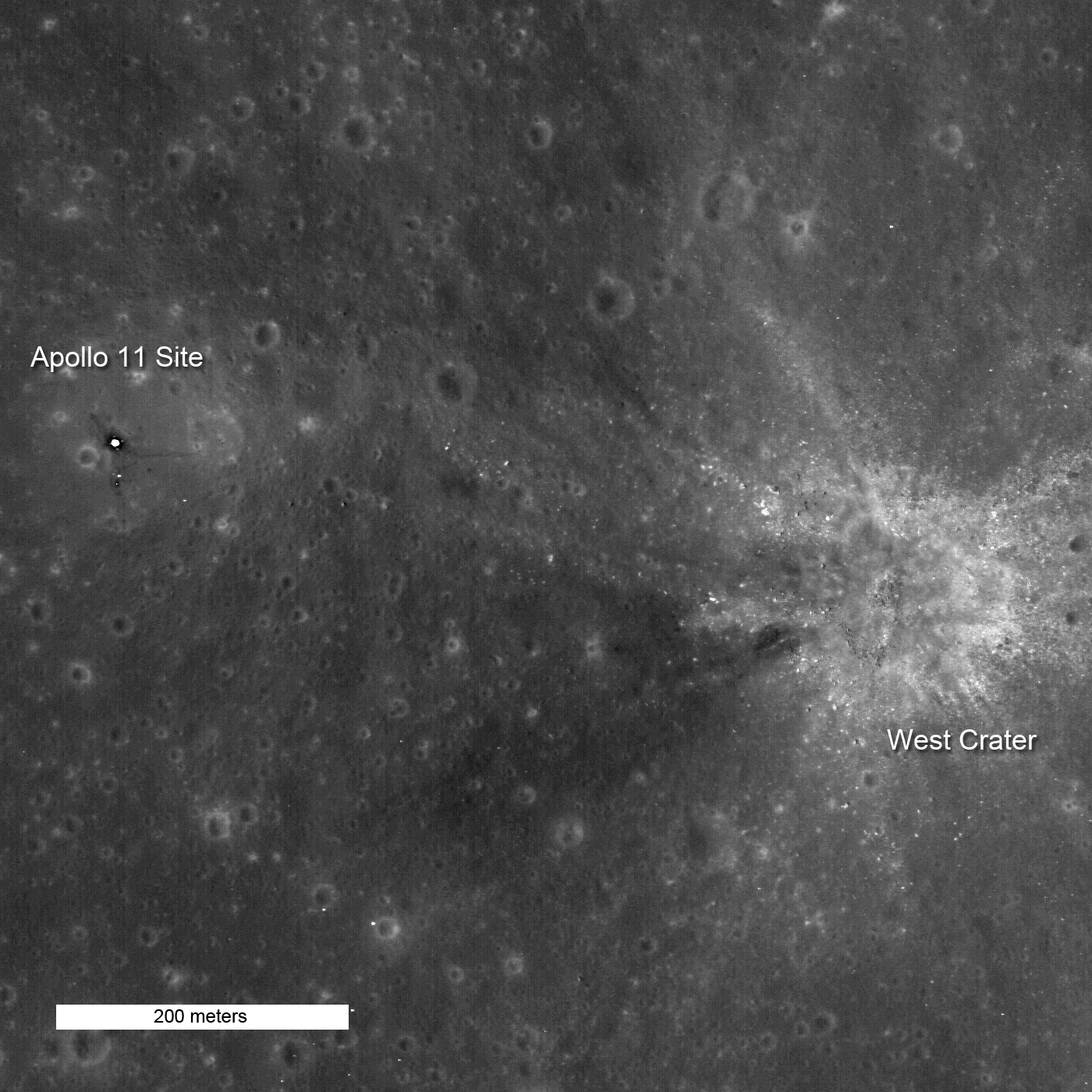
The landing site relative to West crater

ACA was the Attitude Control Assembly—the LM's control stick. Output went to the LGC to command the reaction control system (RCS) jets to fire. "Out of Detent" meant the stick had moved away from its centered position; it was spring-centered like the turn indicator in a car. Address 413 of the Abort Guidance System (AGS) contained the variable that indicated the LM had landed.

Eagle landed at 20:17:40 UTC on Sunday July 20 with 216 pounds (98 kg) of usable fuel remaining. Information available to the crew and mission controllers during the landing showed the LM had enough fuel for another 25 seconds of powered flight before an abort without touchdown would have become unsafe, but post-mission analysis showed that the real figure was probably closer to 50 seconds. Apollo 11 landed with less fuel than most subsequent missions, and the astronauts encountered a premature low fuel warning. This was later found to be the result of the propellant sloshing more than expected, uncovering a fuel sensor. On subsequent missions, extra anti-slosh baffles were added to the tanks to prevent this.

Armstrong acknowledged Aldrin's completion of the post-landing checklist with "Engine arm is off", before responding to the CAPCOM, Charles Duke, with the words, "Houston, Tranquility Base here. The Eagle has landed." Duke expressed the relief at Mission Control: "Roger, Twan—Tranquility, we copy you on the ground. You got a bunch of guys about to turn blue. We're breathing again. Thanks a lot."

A 3-D view from the Lunar Reconnaissance Orbiter (LRO) of the Apollo 11 landing site

Two and a half hours after landing, before preparations began for the EVA, Aldrin radioed to Earth:

This is the LM pilot. I'd like to take this opportunity to ask every person listening in, whoever and wherever they may be, to pause for a moment and contemplate the events of the past few hours and to give thanks in his or her own way.

He then took communion privately. At this time NASA was still fighting a lawsuit brought by atheist Madalyn Murray O'Hair (who had objected to the Apollo 8 crew reading from the Book of Genesis) demanding that their astronauts refrain from broadcasting religious activities while in space. For this reason, Aldrin chose to refrain from directly mentioning taking communion on the Moon. Aldrin was an elder at the Webster Presbyterian Church, and his communion kit was prepared by the pastor of the church, Dean Woodruff. Webster Presbyterian possesses the chalice used on the Moon and commemorates the event each year on the Sunday closest to July 20. The schedule for the mission called for the astronauts to follow the landing with a five-hour sleep period, but they chose to begin preparations for the EVA early, thinking they would be unable to sleep.

=== Lunar surface operations ===
Preparations for Neil Armstrong and Buzz Aldrin to walk on the Moon began at 23:43 UTC. These took longer than expected; three and a half hours instead of two. During training on Earth, everything required had been neatly laid out in advance, but on the Moon the cabin contained a large number of other items as well, such as checklists, food packets, and tools. Six hours and thirty-nine minutes after landing, Armstrong and Aldrin were ready to go outside, and Eagle was depressurized.

Eagle's hatch was opened at 02:39:33. Armstrong initially had some difficulties squeezing through the hatch with his portable life support system (PLSS). Some of the highest heart rates recorded from Apollo astronauts occurred during LM egress and ingress. At 02:51 Armstrong began his descent to the lunar surface. The remote-control unit on his chest kept him from seeing his feet. Climbing down the nine-rung ladder, Armstrong pulled a D-ring to deploy the modular equipment stowage assembly (MESA) folded against Eagle's side and activate the TV camera.

Apollo 11 used slow-scan television (TV) incompatible with broadcast TV, so it was displayed on a special monitor and a conventional TV camera viewed this monitor, significantly reducing the quality of the picture. The signal was received at Goldstone in the United States, but with better fidelity by Honeysuckle Creek Tracking Station near Canberra in Australia. Minutes later the feed was switched to the more sensitive Parkes radio telescope in Australia. Despite some technical and weather difficulties, black and white images of the first lunar EVA were received and broadcast to at least 600 million people on Earth. Copies of this video in broadcast format were saved and are widely available, but recordings of the original slow scan source transmission from the lunar surface were likely destroyed during routine magnetic tape re-use at NASA.

Video of Neil Armstrong and the first step on the Moon

That's one small step...

After describing the surface dust as "very fine-grained" and "almost like a powder", at 02:56:15, six and a half hours after landing, Armstrong stepped off Eagle's landing pad and declared: "That's one small step for [a] man, one giant leap for mankind." (Note: Eric Jones of the Apollo Lunar Surface Journal explains that the indefinite article "a" was intended, whether or not it was said; the intention was to contrast a man (an individual's action) and mankind (as a species).)

Armstrong intended to say "That's one small step for a man", but the word "a" is not audible in the transmission, and thus was not initially reported by most observers of the live broadcast. When later asked about his quote, Armstrong said he believed he said "for a man", and subsequent printed versions of the quote included the "a" in square brackets. One explanation for the absence may be that his accent caused him to slur the words "for a" together; another is the intermittent nature of the audio and video links to Earth, partly because of storms near Parkes Observatory. A more recent digital analysis of the tape claims to reveal the "a" may have been spoken but obscured by static. Other analysis points to the claims of static and slurring as "face-saving fabrication", and that Armstrong himself later admitted to misspeaking the line.

About seven minutes after stepping onto the Moon's surface, Armstrong collected a contingency soil sample using a sample bag on a stick. He then folded the bag and tucked it into a pocket on his right thigh. This was to guarantee there would be some lunar soil brought back in case an emergency required the astronauts to abandon the EVA and return to the LM. Twelve minutes after the sample was collected, he removed the TV camera from the MESA and made a panoramic sweep, then mounted it on a tripod. The TV camera cable remained partly coiled and presented a tripping hazard throughout the EVA. Still photography was accomplished with a Hasselblad camera that could be operated hand-held or mounted on Armstrong's Apollo space suit. Aldrin joined Armstrong on the surface. He described the view with the simple phrase: "Magnificent desolation."

Armstrong said moving in the lunar gravity, one-sixth of Earth's, was "even perhaps easier than the simulations ... It's absolutely no trouble to walk around." Aldrin joined him on the surface and tested methods for moving around, including two-footed kangaroo hops. The PLSS backpack created a tendency to tip backward, but neither astronaut had serious problems maintaining balance. Loping became the preferred method of movement. The astronauts reported that they needed to plan their movements six or seven steps ahead. The fine soil was quite slippery. Aldrin remarked that moving from sunlight into Eagle's shadow produced no temperature change inside the suit, but the helmet was warmer in sunlight, so he felt cooler in shadow. The MESA failed to provide a stable work platform and was in shadow, slowing work somewhat. As they worked, the moonwalkers kicked up gray dust, which soiled the outer part of their suits.

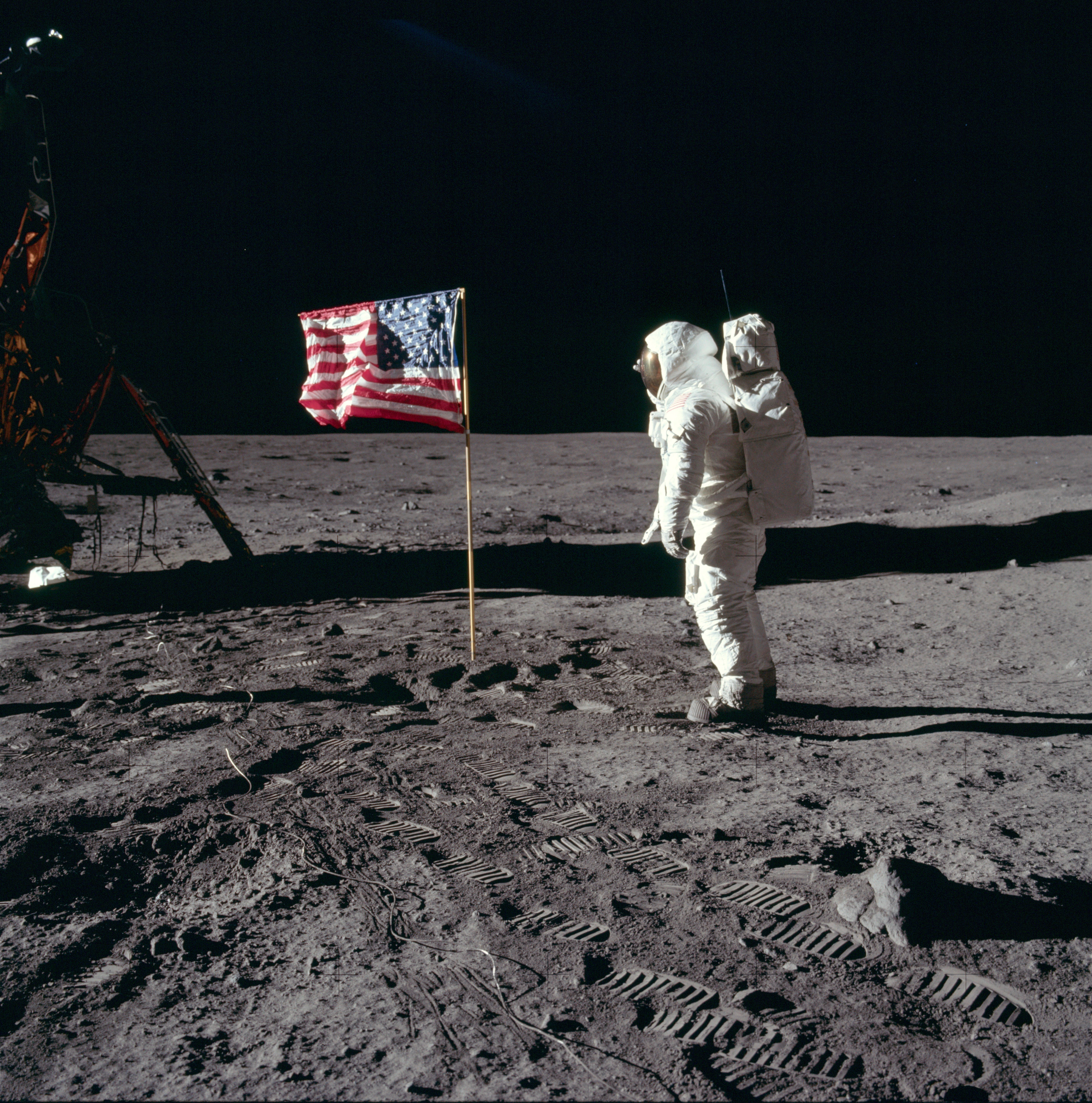
Aldrin salutes the deployed United States flag on the lunar surface.

The astronauts planted the Lunar Flag Assembly containing a flag of the United States on the lunar surface, in clear view of the TV camera. Aldrin remembered, "Of all the jobs I had to do on the Moon the one I wanted to go the smoothest was the flag raising." But the astronauts struggled with the telescoping rod and could only insert the pole about 2 inches (5 cm) into the hard lunar surface. Aldrin was afraid it might topple in front of TV viewers, but gave "a crisp West Point salute".

Before Aldrin could take a photo of Armstrong with the flag, President Richard Nixon spoke to them through a telephone-radio transmission, which Nixon called "the most historic phone call ever made from the White House." Nixon originally had a long speech prepared to read during the phone call, but Frank Borman, who was at the White House as a NASA liaison during Apollo 11, convinced Nixon to keep his words brief.

Nixon: Hello, Neil and Buzz. I'm talking to you by telephone from the Oval Room at the White House. And this certainly has to be the most historic telephone call ever made from the White House. I just can't tell you how proud we all are of what you have done. For every American, this has to be the proudest day of our lives. And for people all over the world, I am sure that they too join with Americans in recognizing what an immense feat this is. Because of what you have done, the heavens have become a part of man's world. And as you talk to us from the Sea of Tranquility, it inspires us to redouble our efforts to bring peace and tranquility to Earth. For one priceless moment in the whole history of man, all the people on this Earth are truly one: one in their pride in what you have done, and one in our prayers that you will return safely to Earth.

Armstrong: Thank you, Mr. President. It's a great honor and privilege for us to be here, representing not only the United States, but men of peace of all nations, and with interest and a curiosity, and men with a vision for the future. It's an honor for us to be able to participate here today.

Nixon: Thank you very much, and I look forward, all of us look forward, to seeing you on the Hornet on Thursday.

Aldrin's bootprint, part of an experiment to test the properties of the lunar regolith

They deployed the EASEP, which included a Passive Seismic Experiment Package used to measure moonquakes and a retroreflector array used for the lunar laser ranging experiment. Then Armstrong walked 196 feet (60 m) from the LM to take photographs at the rim of Little West Crater while Aldrin collected two core samples. He used the geologist's hammer to pound in the tubes—the only time the hammer was used on Apollo 11—but was unable to penetrate more than 6 inches (15 cm) deep. The astronauts then collected rock samples using scoops and tongs on extension handles.

Many of the surface activities took longer than expected, so they had to stop documenting sample collection halfway through the allotted 34 minutes. Aldrin shoveled 6 kilograms (13 lb) of soil into the box of rocks to pack them in tightly. Two types of rocks were found in the geological samples: basalt and breccia. Three new minerals were discovered in the rock samples collected by the astronauts: armalcolite, tranquillityite, and pyroxferroite. Armalcolite was named after Armstrong, Aldrin, and Collins. All have subsequently been found on Earth.

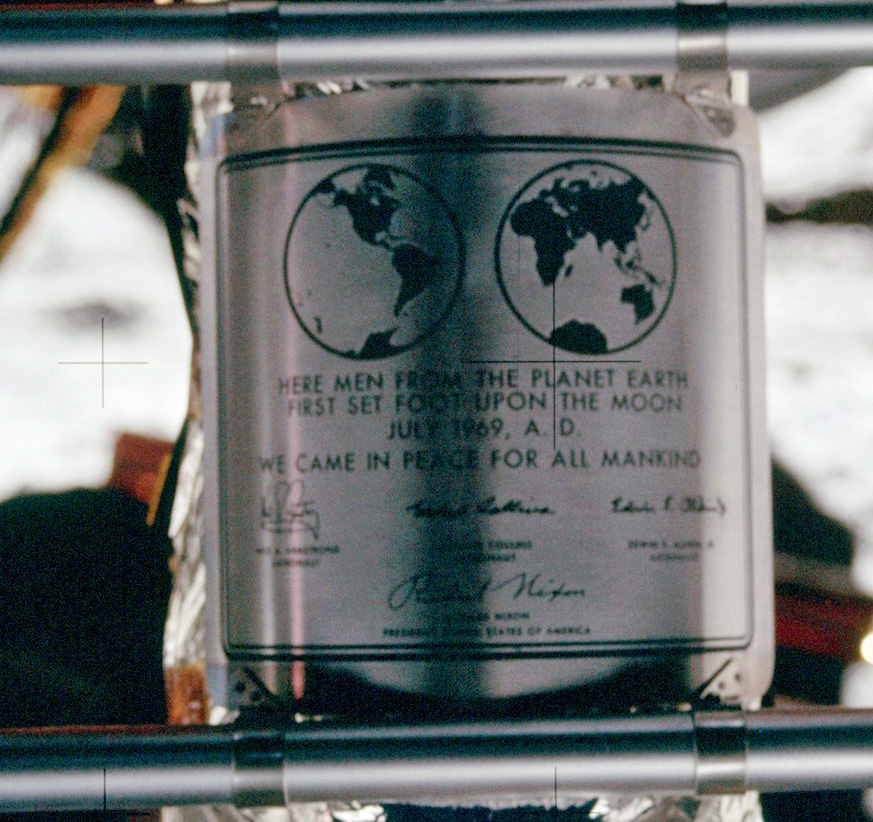
The plaque left on the ladder of Eagle

While on the surface, Armstrong uncovered a plaque mounted on the LM ladder, bearing two drawings of Earth (of the Western and Eastern Hemispheres), an inscription, and signatures of the astronauts and President Nixon. The inscription read:

Here men from the planet Earth first set foot upon the Moon July 1969, A. D. We came in peace for all mankind.

At the behest of the Nixon administration to add a reference to God, NASA included the vague date as a reason to include A.D., which stands for Anno Domini ("in the year of our Lord").

Mission Control used a coded phrase to warn Armstrong his metabolic rates were high, and that he should slow down. He was moving rapidly from task to task as time ran out. As metabolic rates remained generally lower than expected for both astronauts throughout the walk, Mission Control granted the astronauts a 15-minute extension. In a 2010 interview, Armstrong explained that NASA limited the first moonwalk's time and distance because there was no empirical proof of how much cooling water the astronauts' PLSS backpacks would consume to handle their body heat generation while working on the Moon.

=== Lunar ascent ===
Aldrin entered Eagle first. With some difficulty the astronauts lifted film and two sample boxes containing 21.55 kilograms (47.5 lb) of lunar surface material to the LM hatch using a flat cable pulley device called the Lunar Equipment Conveyor (LEC). This proved to be an inefficient tool, and later missions preferred to carry equipment and samples up to the LM by hand. Armstrong reminded Aldrin of a bag of memorial items in his sleeve pocket, and Aldrin tossed the bag down. Armstrong then jumped onto the ladder's third rung, and climbed into the LM. After transferring to LM life support, the explorers lightened the ascent stage for the return to lunar orbit by tossing out their PLSS backpacks, lunar overshoes, an empty Hasselblad camera, and other equipment. The hatch was closed again at 05:11:13. They then pressurized the LM and settled down to sleep.

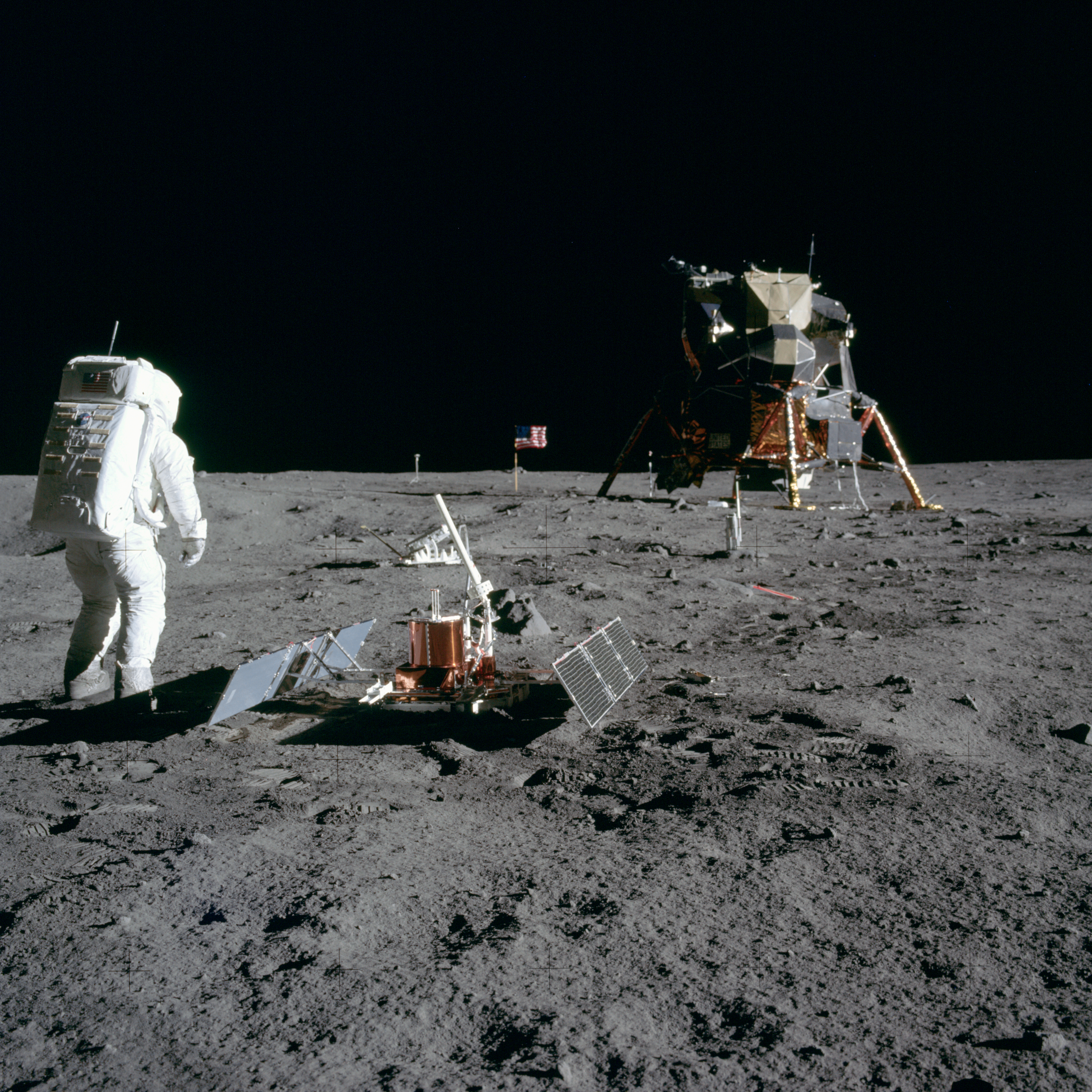
Aldrin next to the Passive Seismic Experiment Package with the Lunar Module Eagle in the background

Presidential speech writer William Safire had prepared an In Event of Moon Disaster announcement for Nixon to read in the event the Apollo 11 astronauts were stranded on the Moon. The remarks were in a memo from Safire to Nixon's White House Chief of Staff H. R. Haldeman, in which Safire suggested a protocol the administration might follow in reaction to such a disaster. According to the plan, Mission Control would "close down communications" with the LM, and a clergyman would "commend their souls to the deepest of the deep" in a public ritual likened to burial at sea. The last line of the prepared text contained an allusion to Rupert Brooke's World War I poem "The Soldier". The script for the speech does not make reference to Collins; as he remained onboard Columbia in orbit around the Moon, it was expected that he would be able to return the module to Earth in the event of a mission failure.

While moving inside the cabin, Aldrin accidentally damaged the circuit breaker that would arm the main engine for liftoff from the Moon. There was a concern this would prevent firing the engine, stranding them on the Moon. The nonconductive tip of a Duro felt-tip pen was sufficient to activate the switch.

After more than 21 1/2 hours on the lunar surface, in addition to the scientific instruments, the astronauts left behind: an Apollo 1 mission patch in memory of astronauts Roger Chaffee, Gus Grissom, and Edward White, who died when their command module caught fire during a test in January 1967; two memorial medals of Soviet cosmonauts Vladimir Komarov and Yuri Gagarin, who died in 1967 and 1968 respectively; a memorial bag containing a gold replica of an olive branch as a traditional symbol of peace; and a silicon message disk carrying the goodwill statements by presidents Eisenhower, Kennedy, Johnson, and Nixon along with messages from leaders of 73 countries around the world. The disk also carries a listing of the leadership of the US Congress, a listing of members of the four committees of the House and Senate responsible for the NASA legislation, and the names of NASA's past and then-current top management.

A map of the Tranquility Base landing site and photos taken

After about seven hours of rest, the crew was awakened by Houston to prepare for the return flight. At that time, unknown to them, some hundred kilometers away from them the Soviet probe Luna 15 was about to descend and impact. Despite having been known to be orbiting the Moon at the same time, through a ground-breaking precautious goodwill exchange of data, the mission control of Luna 15 unexpectedly hastened its robotic sample-return mission, initiating descent, in an attempt to return before Apollo 11. Just two hours before Apollo 11's launch, Luna 15 crashed at 15:50 UTC, with British astronomers monitoring Luna 15 and recording the situation one commented: "I say, this has really been drama of the highest order", bringing the Space Race to a culmination.

Roughly two hours later, at 17:54:00 UTC, the Apollo 11 crew on the surface safely lifted off in Eagle's ascent stage to rejoin Collins aboard Columbia in lunar orbit. Film taken from the LM ascent stage upon liftoff from the Moon reveals the American flag, planted some 25 feet (8 m) from the descent stage, whipping violently in the exhaust of the ascent stage engine. Aldrin looked up in time to witness the flag topple: "The ascent stage of the LM separated ... I was concentrating on the computers, and Neil was studying the attitude indicator, but I looked up long enough to see the flag fall over." Subsequent Apollo missions planted their flags farther from the LM.

=== Columbia in lunar orbit ===
During his day flying solo around the Moon, Collins never felt lonely. Although it has been said "not since Adam has any human known such solitude", Collins felt very much a part of the mission. In his autobiography he wrote: "this venture has been structured for three men, and I consider my third to be as necessary as either of the other two". In the 48 minutes of each orbit when he was out of radio contact with the Earth while Columbia passed round the far side of the Moon, the feeling he reported was not fear or loneliness, but rather "awareness, anticipation, satisfaction, confidence, almost exultation".

One of Collins' first tasks was to identify the Lunar Module on the ground. To give Collins an idea where to look, Mission Control radioed that they believed the Lunar Module landed about 4 miles (6.4 km) off target. Each time he passed over the suspected lunar landing site, he tried in vain to find the module. On his first orbits on the back side of the Moon, Collins performed maintenance activities such as dumping excess water produced by the fuel cells and preparing the cabin for Armstrong and Aldrin to return.

Just before he reached the far side on the third orbit, Mission Control informed Collins there was a problem with the temperature of the coolant. If it became too cold, parts of Columbia might freeze. Mission Control advised him to assume manual control and implement Environmental Control System Malfunction Procedure 17. Instead, Collins flicked the switch on the system from automatic to manual and back to automatic again, and carried on with normal housekeeping chores, while keeping an eye on the temperature.

When Columbia came back around to the near side of the Moon again, Collins was able to report that the problem had been resolved. For the next couple of orbits, he described his time on the back side of the Moon as "relaxing". After Aldrin and Armstrong completed their EVA, Collins slept so he could be rested for the rendezvous. While the flight plan called for Eagle to meet up with Columbia, Collins was prepared for a contingency in which he would fly Columbia down to meet Eagle.

=== Return ===
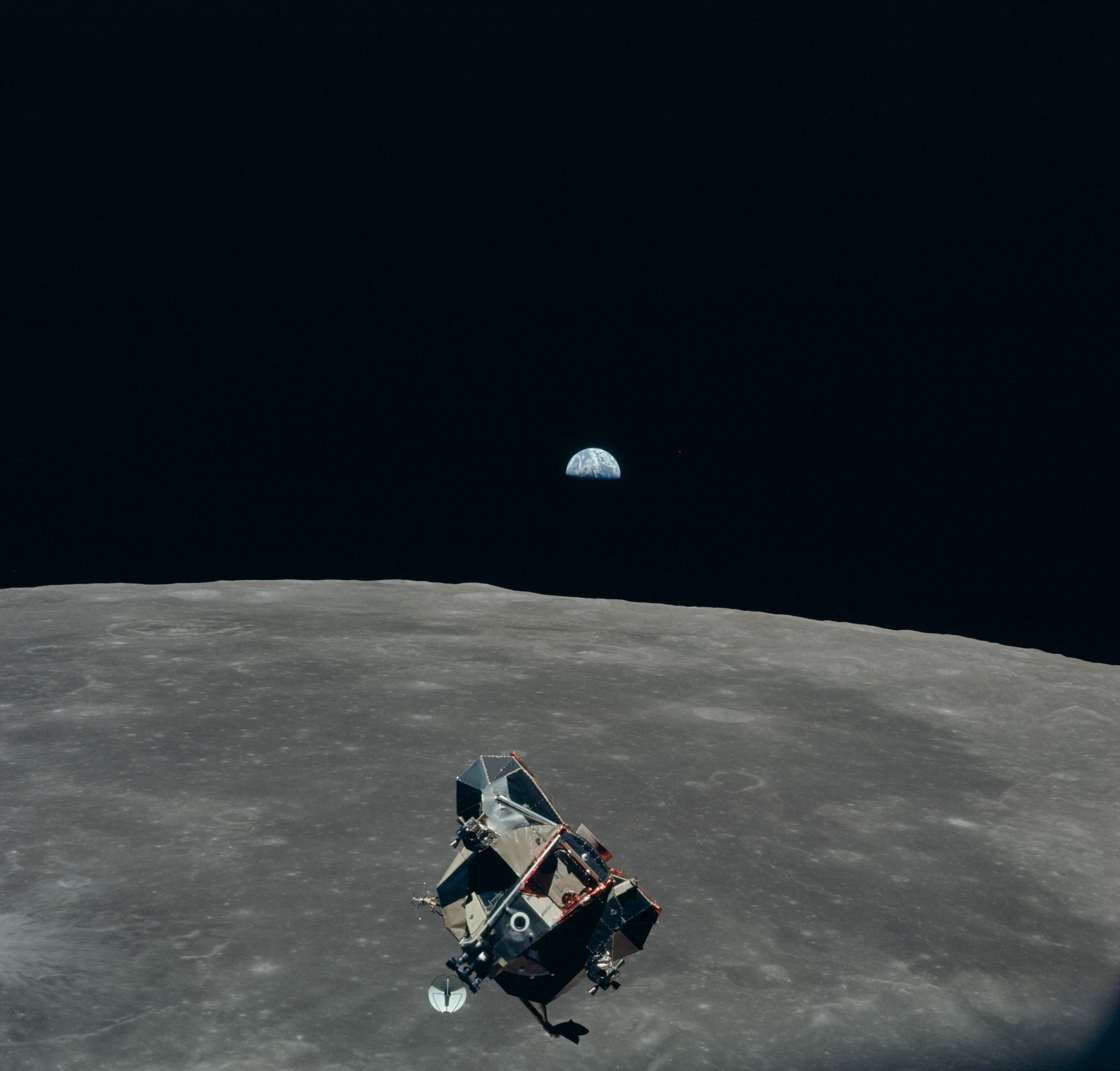
Eagle's ascent stage approaching Columbia

Eagle rendezvoused with Columbia at 21:24 UTC on July 21, and the two docked at 21:35. Eagle's ascent stage was jettisoned into lunar orbit at 23:41. Just before the Apollo 12 flight, it was noted that Eagle was still likely to be orbiting the Moon. Later NASA reports mentioned that Eagle's orbit had decayed, resulting in it impacting in an "uncertain location" on the lunar surface. In 2021, however, some calculations show that the lander may still be in orbit.

On July 23, the last night before splashdown, the three astronauts made a television broadcast in which Collins commented: "All this is possible only through the blood, sweat, and tears of a number of people ... All you see is the three of us, but beneath the surface are thousands and thousands of others, and to all of those, I would like to say, 'Thank you very much'." Aldrin added: "This has been far more than three men on a mission to the Moon; more, still, than the efforts of a government and industry team; more, even, than the efforts of one nation. We feel that this stands as a symbol of the insatiable curiosity of all mankind to explore the unknown ..."

Armstrong concluded:

The responsibility for this flight lies first with history and with the giants of science who have preceded this effort; next with the American people, who have, through their will, indicated their desire; next with four administrations and their Congresses, for implementing that will; and then, with the agency and industry teams that built our spacecraft, the Saturn, the Columbia, the Eagle, and the little EMU, the spacesuit and backpack that was our small spacecraft out on the lunar surface. We would like to give special thanks to all those Americans who built the spacecraft; who did the construction, design, the tests, and put their hearts and all their abilities into those craft. To those people tonight, we give a special thank you, and to all the other people that are listening and watching tonight, God bless you. Good night from Apollo 11.

On the return to Earth, a bearing at the Guam tracking station failed, potentially preventing communication on the last segment of the Earth return. A regular repair was not possible in the available time but the station director, Charles Force, had his ten-year-old son Greg use his small hands to reach into the housing and pack it with grease. Greg was later thanked by Armstrong.

=== Splashdown and quarantine ===
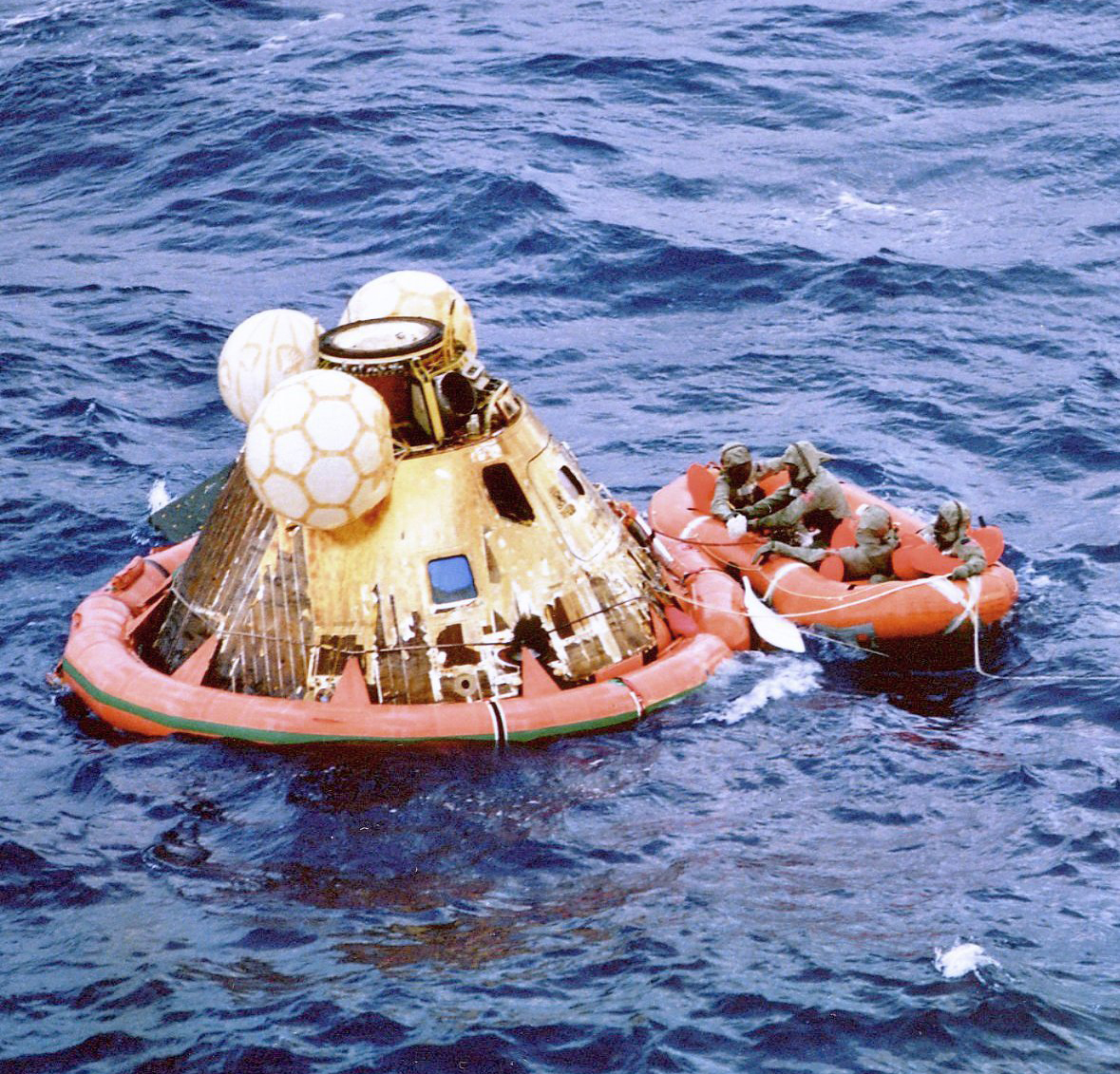
Columbia floats on the ocean as Navy divers assist in retrieving the astronauts.

The aircraft carrier USS Hornet, under the command of Captain Carl J. Seiberlich, was selected as the primary recovery ship (PRS) for Apollo 11 on June 5, replacing her sister ship, the LPH USS Princeton, which had recovered Apollo 10 on May 26. Hornet was then at her home port of Long Beach, California. On reaching Pearl Harbor on July 5, Hornet embarked the Sikorsky SH-3 Sea King helicopters of HS-4, a unit which specialized in recovery of Apollo spacecraft, specialized divers of UDT Detachment Apollo, a 35-man NASA recovery team, and about 120 media representatives. To make room, most of Hornet's air wing was left behind in Long Beach. Special recovery equipment was also loaded, including a boilerplate command module used for training.

On July 12, with Apollo 11 still on the launch pad, Hornet departed Pearl Harbor for the recovery area in the central Pacific, in the vicinity of 10°36′N 172°24′E. A presidential party consisting of Nixon, Borman, Secretary of State William P. Rogers and National Security Advisor Henry Kissinger flew to Johnston Atoll on Air Force One, then to the command ship USS Arlington in Marine One. After a night on board, they would fly to Hornet in Marine One for a few hours of ceremonies. On arrival aboard Hornet, the party was greeted by the Commander-in-Chief, Pacific Command (CINCPAC), Admiral John S. McCain Jr., and NASA Administrator Thomas O. Paine, who flew to Hornet from Pago Pago in one of Hornet's carrier onboard delivery aircraft.

Weather satellites were not yet common, but US Air Force Captain Hank Brandli had access to top-secret spy satellite images. He realized that a storm front was headed for the Apollo recovery area. Poor visibility which could make locating the capsule difficult, and strong upper-level winds which "would have ripped their parachutes to shreds" according to Brandli, posed a serious threat to the safety of the mission. Brandli alerted Navy Captain Willard S. Houston Jr., the commander of the Fleet Weather Center at Pearl Harbor, who had the required security clearance. On their recommendation, Rear Admiral Donald C. Davis, commander of Manned Spaceflight Recovery Forces, Pacific, advised NASA to change the recovery area, each man risking his career. A new location was selected 215 nautical miles (398 km) northeast.

This altered the flight plan. A different sequence of computer programs was used, one never before attempted. In a conventional entry, trajectory event P64 was followed by P67. For a skip-out re-entry, P65 and P66 were employed to handle the exit and entry parts of the skip. In this case, because they were extending the re-entry but not actually skipping out, P66 was not invoked and instead, P65 led directly to P67. The crew were also warned they would not be in a full-lift (heads-down) attitude when they entered P67. The first program's acceleration subjected the astronauts to 6.5 standard gravities (64 m/s^{2}); the second, to 6.0 standard gravities (59 m/s^{2}).

Before dawn on July 24, Hornet launched four Sea King helicopters and three Grumman E-1 Tracers. Two of the E-1s were designated as "air boss" while the third acted as a communications relay aircraft. Two of the Sea Kings carried divers and recovery equipment. The third carried photographic equipment, and the fourth carried the decontamination swimmer and the flight surgeon. At 16:44 UTC (05:44 local time) Columbia's drogue parachutes were deployed. This was observed by the helicopters. Seven minutes later Columbia struck the water forcefully 2,660 km (1,440 nmi) east of Wake Island, 380 km (210 nmi) south of Johnston Atoll, and 24 km (13 nmi) from Hornet, at 13°19′N 169°9′W. 82 °F (28 °C) with 6 feet (1.8 m) seas and winds at 17 knots (31 km/h; 20 mph) from the east were reported under broken clouds at 1,500 feet (460 m) with visibility of 10 nautical miles (19 km; 12 mi) at the recovery site. Reconnaissance aircraft flying to the original splashdown location reported the conditions Brandli and Houston had predicted.

During splashdown, Columbia landed upside down but was righted within ten minutes by flotation bags activated by the astronauts. A diver from the Navy helicopter hovering above attached a sea anchor to prevent it from drifting. More divers attached flotation collars to stabilize the module and positioned rafts for astronaut extraction.

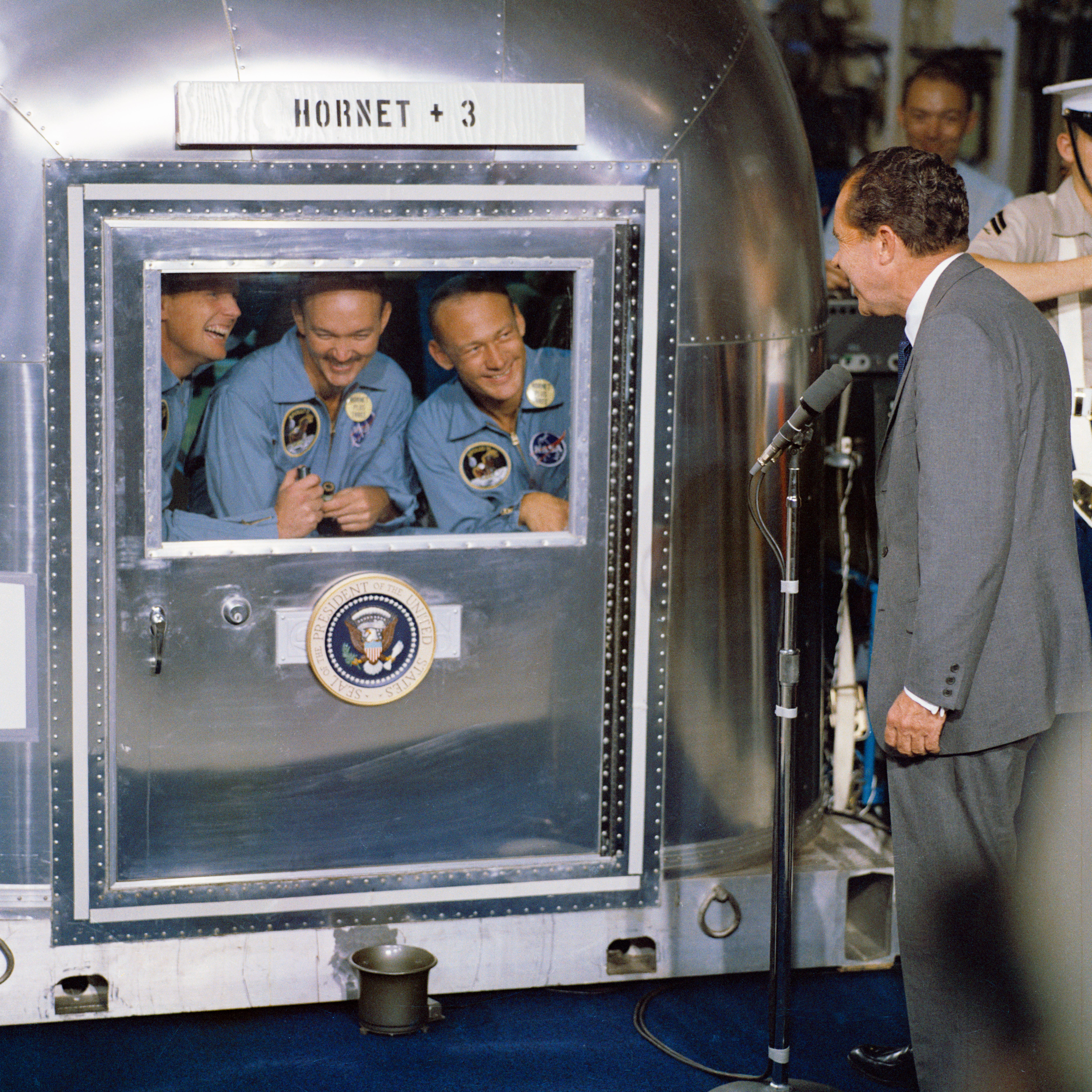
Crew of Apollo 11 in quarantine after returning to Earth, visited by Richard Nixon

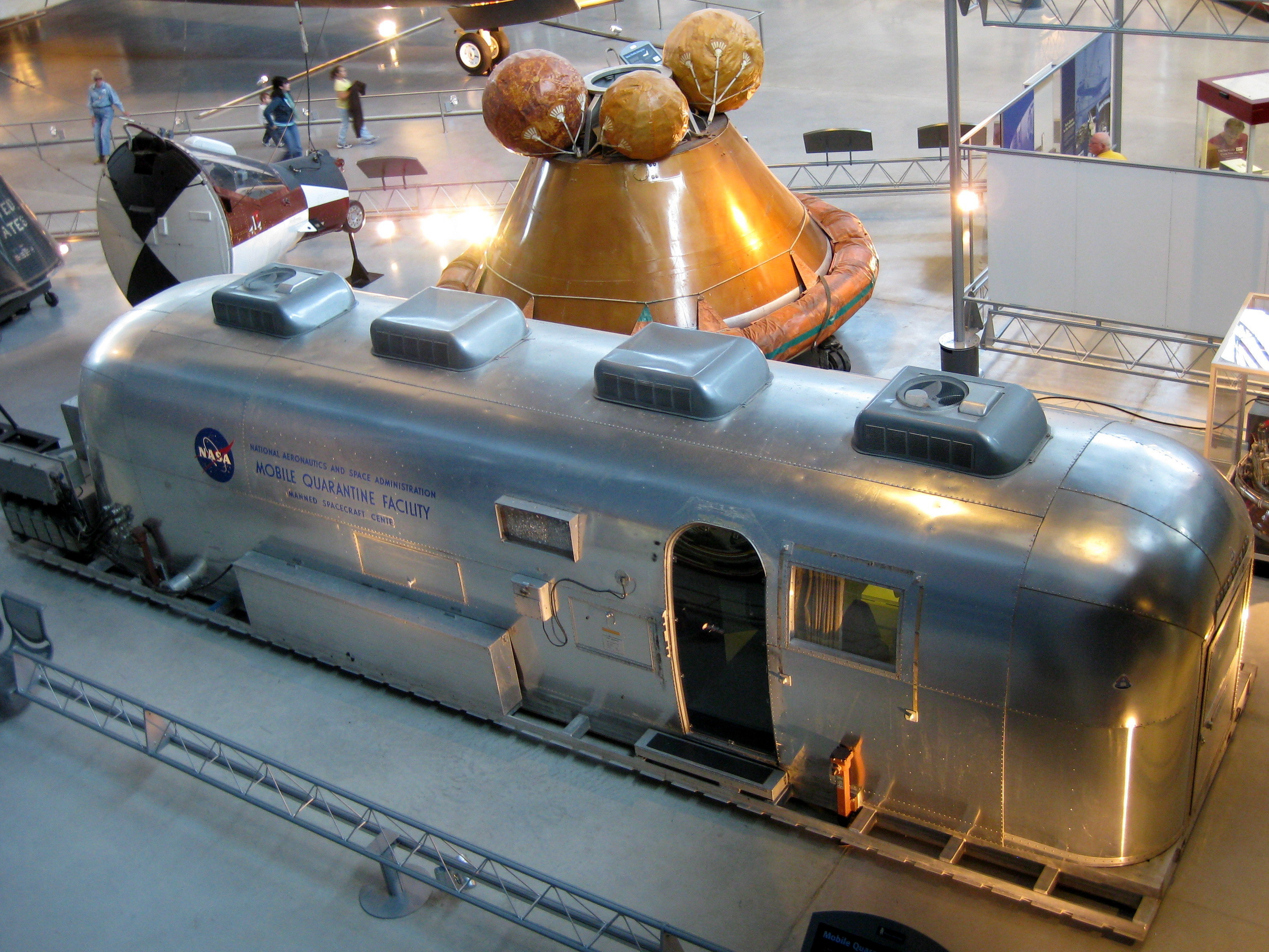
Apollo 11 Mobile Quarantine Facility on display at the Steven F. Udvar-Hazy Center in Virginia in 2009

The divers then passed biological isolation garments (BIGs) to the astronauts, and assisted them into the life raft. The possibility of bringing back pathogens from the lunar surface was considered remote, but NASA took precautions at the recovery site. The astronauts were rubbed down with a sodium hypochlorite solution and Columbia wiped with povidone-iodine to remove any lunar dust that might be present. The astronauts were winched on board the recovery helicopter. BIGs were worn until they reached isolation facilities on board Hornet. The raft containing decontamination materials was intentionally sunk.

After touchdown on Hornet at 17:53 UTC, the helicopter was lowered by the elevator into the hangar bay, where the astronauts walked the 30 feet (9.1 m) to the mobile quarantine facility (MQF), where they would begin the Earth-based portion of their 21 days of quarantine. This practice would continue for two more Apollo missions, Apollo 12 and Apollo 14, before the Moon was proven to be barren of life, and the quarantine process dropped. Nixon welcomed the astronauts back to Earth. He told them: "[A]s a result of what you've done, the world has never been closer together before."

After Nixon departed, Hornet was brought alongside the 5-short-ton (4.5 t) Columbia, which was lifted aboard by the ship's crane, placed on a dolly and moved next to the MQF. It was then attached to the MQF with a flexible tunnel, allowing the lunar samples, film, data tapes and other items to be removed by MQF project engineer John Hirasaki. He placed the two Apollo Lunar Sample Return Containers (ALSRC) containing lunar samples, space suits and film cassettes into plastic bags. Hirasaki then passed the bags out of the MQF through a transfer lock with a decontamination wash. All of the collected materials were flown to Ellington Air Force Base in Houston and taken to the Lunar Receiving Laboratory (LRL) within 48 hours of splashdown.

Hornet returned to Pearl Harbor on July 26, where it was welcomed by thousands of people. The MQF was loaded onto a Lockheed C-141 Starlifter at Hickam Air Force Base and airlifted to Houston, landing on July 27. The astronauts arrived at the LRL at 10:00 UTC on July 28. Columbia was taken to Ford Island for deactivation, and its pyrotechnics made safe. It was then taken to Hickham Air Force Base, from whence it was flown to Houston in a Douglas C-133 Cargomaster, reaching the Lunar Receiving Laboratory on July 30.

In accordance with the Extra-Terrestrial Exposure Law, a set of regulations promulgated by NASA on July 16 to codify its quarantine protocol, the astronauts continued in quarantine. After three weeks in confinement (first in the Apollo spacecraft, then in their trailer on Hornet, and finally in the Lunar Receiving Laboratory), the astronauts were given a clean bill of health. On August 10, 1969, the Interagency Committee on Back Contamination met in Atlanta and lifted the quarantine on the astronauts, on those who had joined them in quarantine (NASA physician William Carpentier and John Hirasaki), and on Columbia itself. Loose equipment from the spacecraft remained in isolation until the lunar samples were released for study.

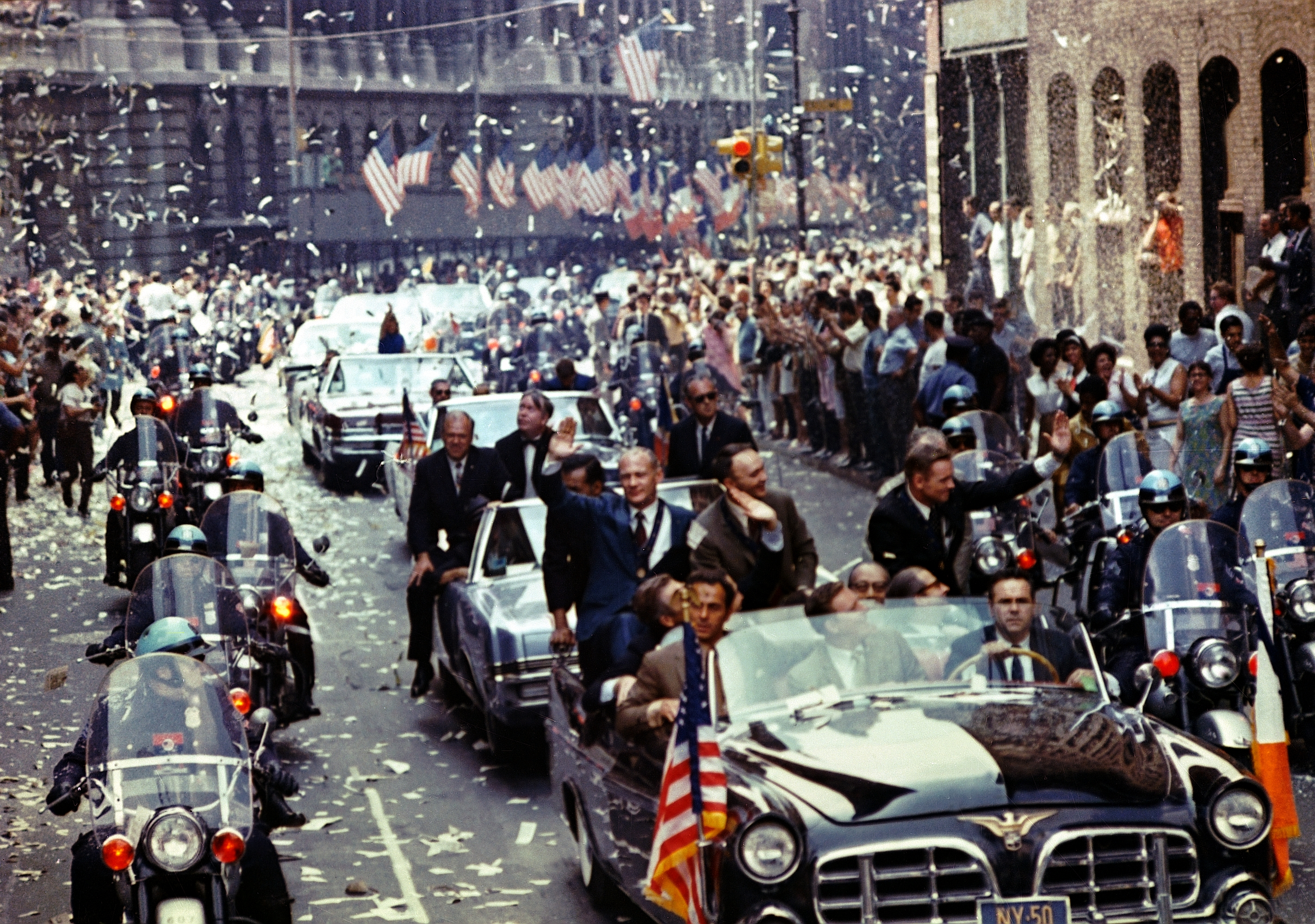
August 13, 1969, New York City

== Celebrations ==
Following their return to Earth, the Apollo 11 crew received widespread international acclaim. On August 13, 1969, astronauts Neil Armstrong, Buzz Aldrin, and Michael Collins were honored with ticker-tape parades in New York City and Chicago, with an estimated six million people lining the streets. In New York the parade started at Bowling Green going down Broadway to City Hall where Mayor John Lindsay greeted them and ended at the United Nations headquarters. Broadway was temporarily renamed for that day to "Apollo Way". In Chicago the parade went to the Loop and culminated at the Chicago Civic Center where the astronauts and local officials spoke to the crowd. That evening, a state dinner was held in Los Angeles at the Century Plaza Hotel to commemorate the historic achievement. The event was attended by members of Congress, 44 state governors, Chief Justice of the United States Warren E. Burger and his predecessor Earl Warren, as well as ambassadors from 83 nations. President Richard Nixon and Vice President Spiro Agnew awarded each astronaut the Presidential Medal of Freedom, the highest civilian honor in the United States.

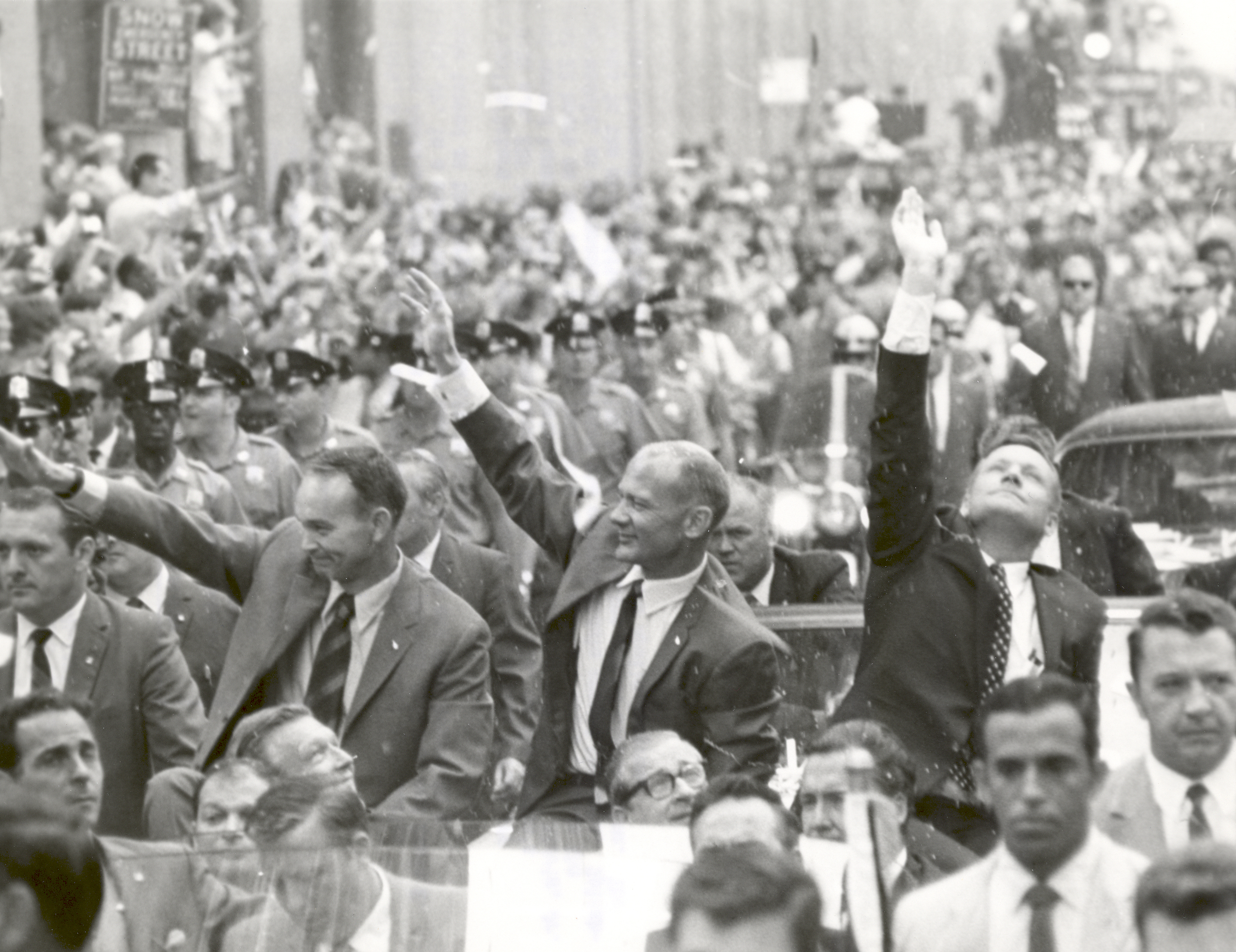
Apollo 11 Astronauts - New York City - August 13, 1969

On September 16, the astronauts addressed a joint session of Congress, where they presented two American flags—one to the House of Representatives and one to the Senate—that had traveled to the lunar surface aboard Eagle.

One of the mission flags carried aboard the flight—the Flag of American Samoa—was later displayed at the Jean P. Haydon Museum in Pago Pago, the capital of American Samoa, recognizing the territory's support role as a recovery staging area.

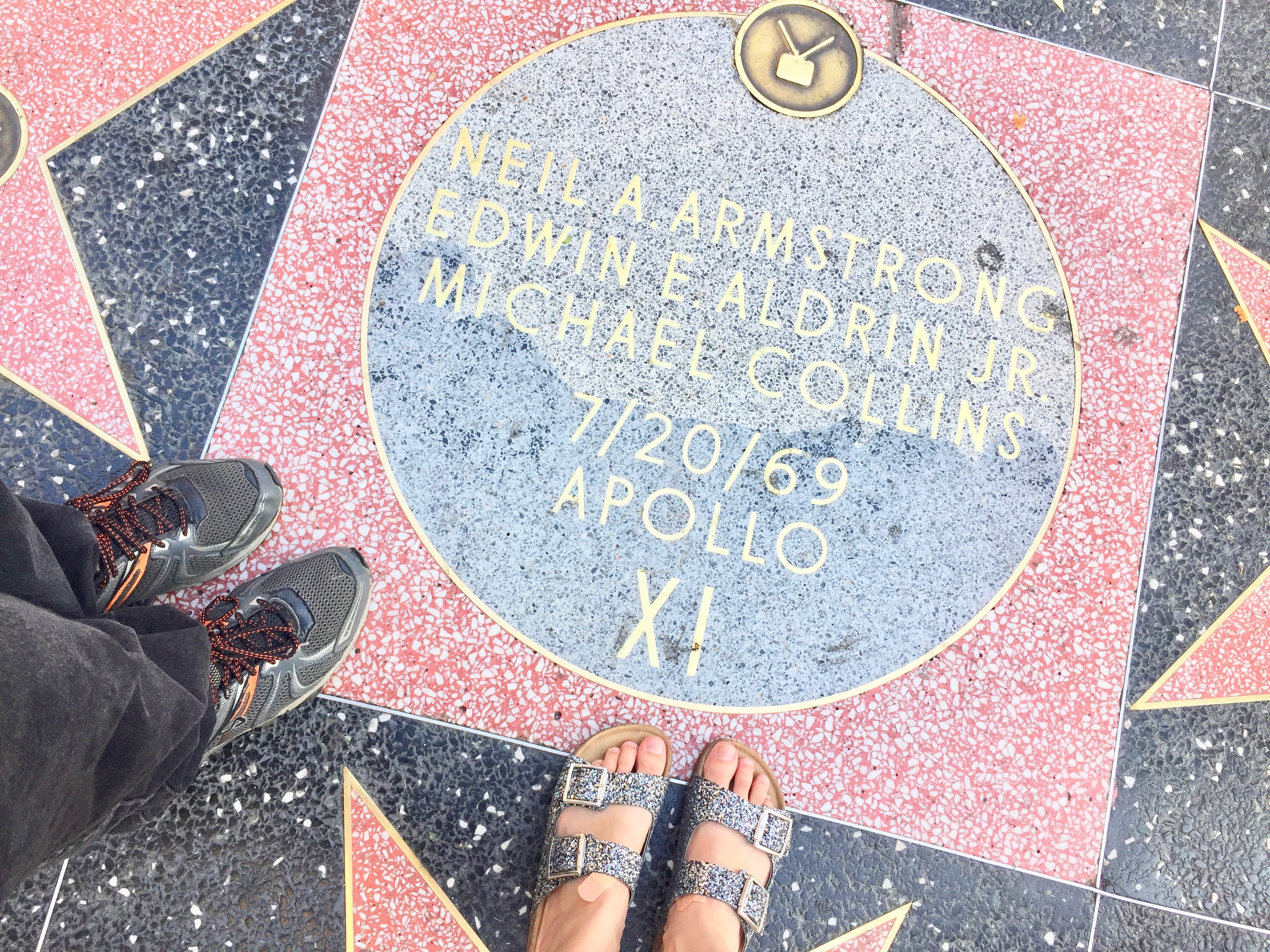
Terrazzo tribute to Apollo 11 astronauts on the Hollywood Walk of Fame

Numerous countries and organizations honored the Moon landing by issuing special commemorative items. These included postage stamps, coins, medals, plaques, and magazine features. TIME, National Geographic, LIFE, and dozens of international publications featured the astronauts on their covers. Many of these commemoratives are now held in public and private collections, and some were placed aboard later Apollo missions in symbolic tribute.

Additionally, the success of Apollo 11 contributed to a brief spike in interest in science and technology education, often referred to as the "Apollo effect", influencing a generation of engineers and scientists.

=== World tour ===
The celebrations continued with a 38-day world goodwill tour titled "Giant Leap", which began on September 29 and concluded on November 5, 1969. The astronauts visited 22 countries and met with numerous heads of state, prime ministers, royalty, and civic leaders. The tour, intended to thank the international community for their support of the space program, began in Mexico City and ended in Tokyo. Notable stops included Bogotá, Buenos Aires, Rio de Janeiro, Madrid, Paris, Amsterdam, Brussels, London, West Berlin, Rome, Belgrade, Tehran, Mumbai, Bangkok, Sydney, Guam, and Honolulu. Crowds in the tens or hundreds of thousands gathered to greet the astronauts in each city.

In London the astronauts went to Buckingham Palace, where they were greeted by Queen Elizabeth II. When they went to West Berlin, they were given a tour of the Berlin Wall by the city's mayor. In Belgrade, Yugoslavia, they were greeted by a crowd of between 400,000 and 500,000 people from the airport to the Tomb of the Unknown Soldier, where they placed a wreath and were welcomed to a luncheon by Josip Broz Tito. In Kinshasa, Democratic Republic of the Congo, they received the National Order of the Leopard by President Mobutu Sese Seko.

== Legacy ==
=== Cultural significance ===
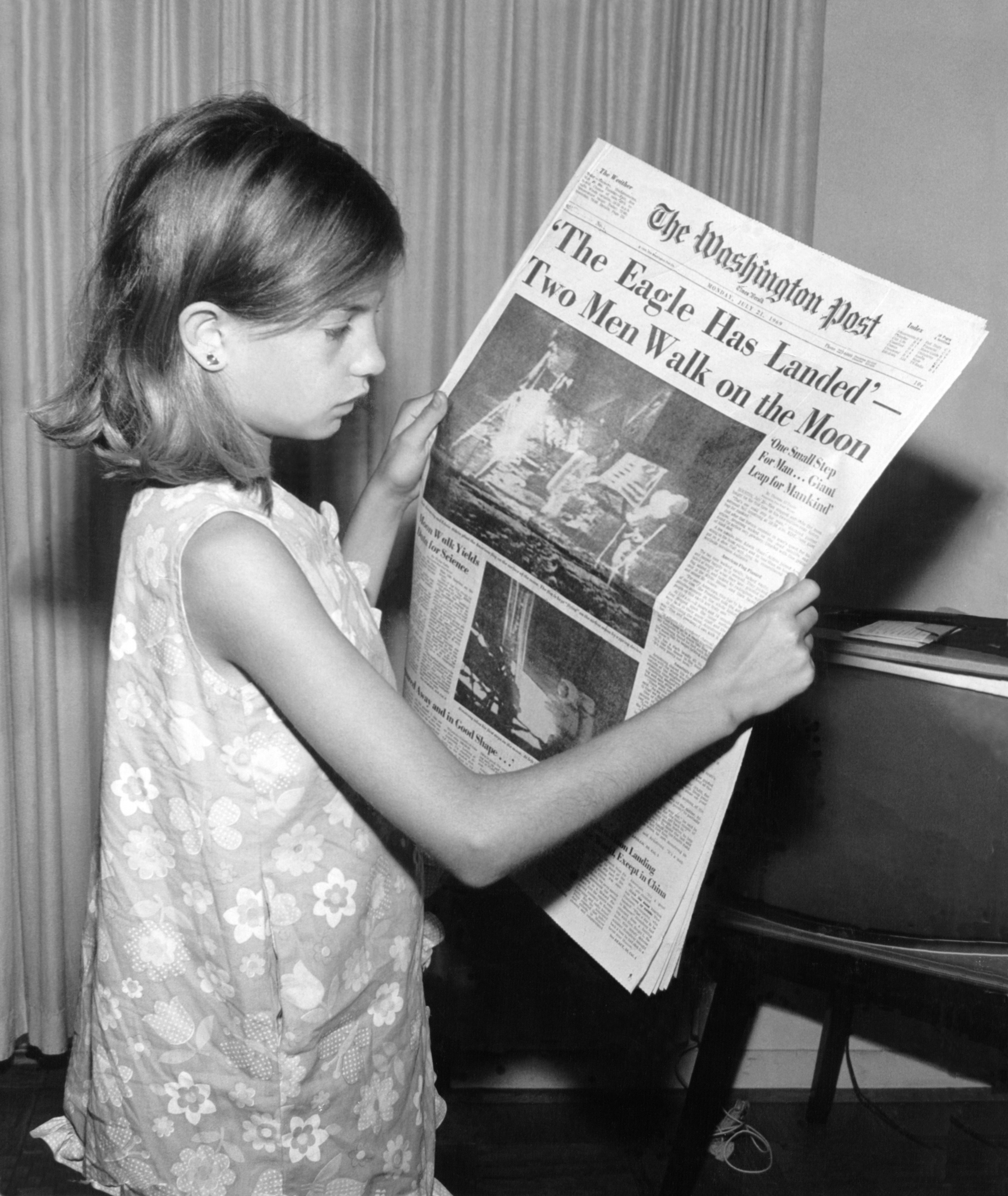
A girl holding The Washington Post newspaper stating "'The Eagle Has Landed' – Two Men Walk on the Moon"

Humans walking on the Moon and returning safely to Earth accomplished Kennedy's goal set eight years earlier. In Mission Control during the Apollo 11 landing, Kennedy's speech flashed on the screen, followed by the words "TASK ACCOMPLISHED, July 1969". The success of Apollo 11 demonstrated the United States' technological superiority; and with the success of Apollo 11, America had won the Space Race.

New phrases permeated into the English language. "If they can send a man to the Moon, why can't they ...?" became a common saying following Apollo 11. Armstrong's words on the lunar surface also spun off various parodies.

While most people celebrated the accomplishment, disenfranchised Americans saw it as a symbol of the divide in America, evidenced by protesters led by Ralph Abernathy outside of Kennedy Space Center the day before Apollo 11 launched. NASA Administrator Thomas Paine met with Abernathy at the occasion, both hoping that the space program can spur progress also in other regards, such as poverty in the US. Paine was then asked, and agreed, to host protesters as spectators at the launch, including Abernathy. Jazz poet Gil Scott-Heron wrote a poem called "Whitey on the Moon" (1970) expressing his view that the mission was emblematic of racial inequality in the United States. The poem starts with:

A rat done bit my sister Nell.
(with Whitey on the moon)
Her face and arms began to swell.
(and Whitey's on the moon)
I can't pay no doctor bill.
(but Whitey's on the moon)
Ten years from now I'll be paying still.
(while Whitey's on the moon)
[...]

Twenty percent of the world's population watched humans walk on the Moon for the first time. While Apollo 11 sparked the interest of the world, the follow-on Apollo missions did not hold the interest of the nation. One possible explanation was the shift in complexity. Landing someone on the Moon was an easy goal to understand; lunar geology was too abstract for the average person. Another is that Kennedy's goal of landing humans on the Moon had already been accomplished. A well-defined objective helped Project Apollo accomplish its goal, but after it was completed it was hard to justify continuing the lunar missions.

While most Americans were proud of their nation's achievements in space exploration, only once during the late 1960s did the Gallup Poll indicate that a majority of Americans favored "doing more" in space as opposed to "doing less". By 1973, 59 percent of those polled favored cutting spending on space exploration. The Space Race had been won, and Cold War tensions were easing as the US and Soviet Union entered the era of détente. This was also a time when inflation was rising, which put pressure on the government to reduce spending. The space program was saved due to the perception that it was one of the few government programs that had achieved something great. Drastic cuts, warned Caspar Weinberger, the deputy director of the Office of Management and Budget, might send a signal that "our best years are behind us".

After the Apollo 11 mission, officials from the Soviet Union said landing humans on the Moon was dangerous and unnecessary. At the time the Soviet Union was attempting to retrieve lunar samples robotically. The Soviets publicly denied there was a race to the Moon, and indicated they were not making an attempt. Mstislav Keldysh said in July 1969, "We are concentrating wholly on the creation of large satellite systems." It was revealed in 1989 that the Soviets had tried to send people to the Moon, but were unable due to technological difficulties. The public's reaction in the Soviet Union was mixed. The Soviet government limited the release of information about the lunar landing, which affected the reaction. A portion of the populace did not give it any attention, and another portion was angered by it.

=== Spacecraft ===
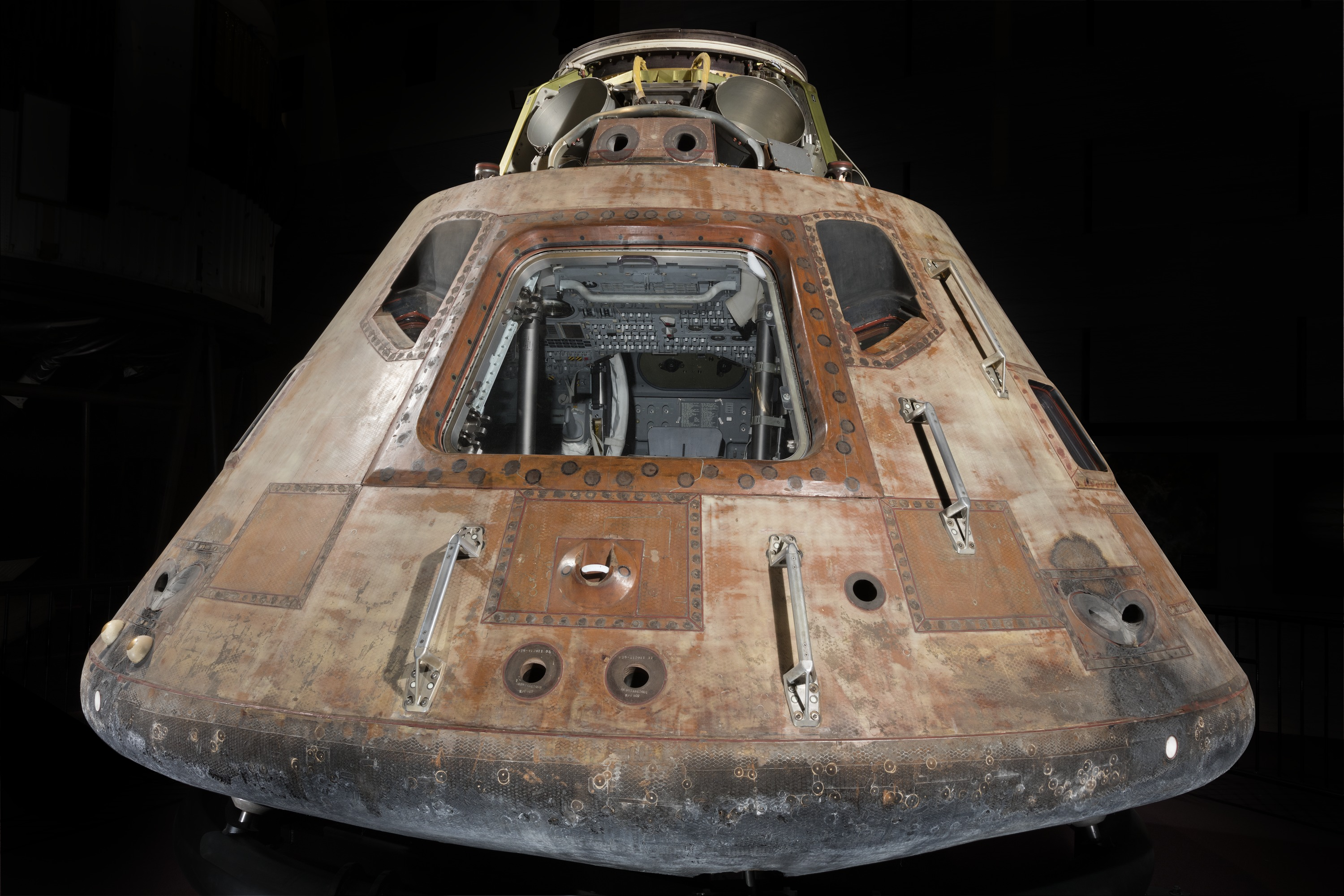
Columbia on display in the Milestones of Flight exhibition hall at the National Air and Space Museum

The command module Columbia went on a tour of the United States, visiting 49 state capitals, the District of Columbia, and Anchorage, Alaska. In 1971, it was transferred to the Smithsonian Institution, and was displayed at the National Air and Space Museum (NASM) in Washington, DC. It was in the central Milestones of Flight exhibition hall in front of the Jefferson Drive entrance, sharing the main hall with other pioneering flight vehicles such as the Wright Flyer, Spirit of St. Louis, Bell X-1, North American X-15 and Friendship 7.

Columbia was moved in 2017 to the NASM Mary Baker Engen Restoration Hangar at the Steven F. Udvar-Hazy Center in Chantilly, Virginia, to be readied for a four-city tour titled Destination Moon: The Apollo 11 Mission. This included Space Center Houston from October 14, 2017, to March 18, 2018, the Saint Louis Science Center from April 14 to September 3, 2018, the Senator John Heinz History Center in Pittsburgh from September 29, 2018, to February 18, 2019, and its last location at Museum of Flight in Seattle from March 16 to September 2, 2019. Continued renovations at the Smithsonian allowed time for an additional stop for the capsule, and it was moved to the Cincinnati Museum Center. The ribbon cutting ceremony was on September 29, 2019.

For 40 years Armstrong's and Aldrin's space suits were displayed in the museum's Apollo to the Moon exhibit, until it permanently closed on December 3, 2018, to be replaced by a new gallery which was scheduled to open in 2022. A special display of Armstrong's suit was unveiled for the 50th anniversary of Apollo 11 in July 2019. The quarantine trailer, the flotation collar and the flotation bags are in the Smithsonian's Steven F. Udvar-Hazy Center annex near Washington Dulles International Airport in Chantilly, Virginia, where they are on display along with a test lunar module.

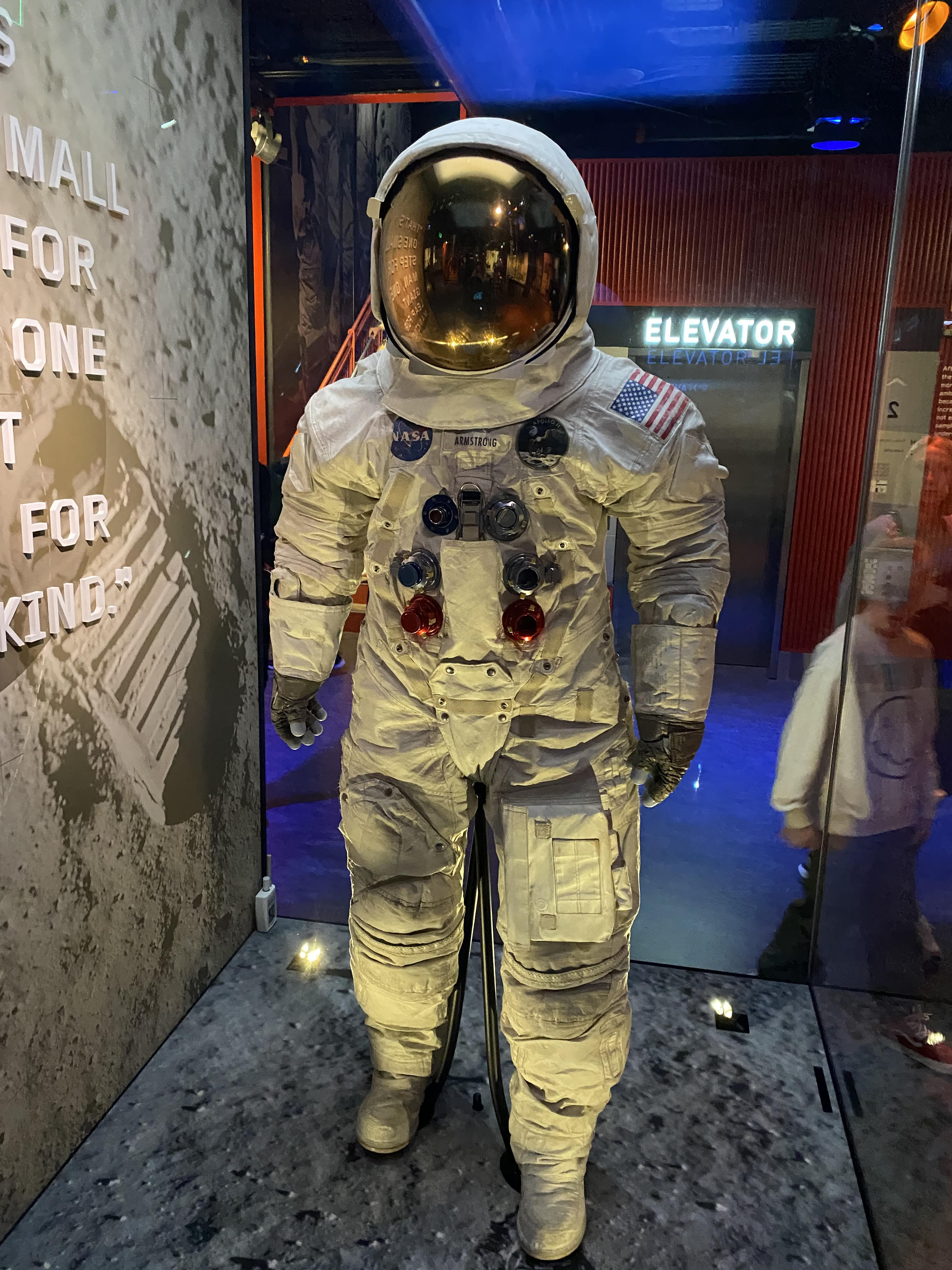
Armstrong's space suit on display at the National Air and Space Museum in its new exhibit

The descent stage of the LM Eagle remains on the Moon. In 2009, the Lunar Reconnaissance Orbiter (LRO) imaged the various Apollo landing sites on the surface of the Moon, for the first time with sufficient resolution to see the descent stages of the lunar modules, scientific instruments, and foot trails made by the astronauts.

The remains of the ascent stage are assumed to lie at an unknown location on the lunar surface. The ascent stage, Eagle, was not tracked after it was jettisoned. The lunar gravity field is sufficiently non-uniform to make low Moon orbits unstable after a short time, leading the orbiting object to impact the surface. However, using a program developed by NASA, and high-resolution lunar gravity data, a paper was published, in 2021, indicating that Eagle might still be in orbit as late as 2020. Using the orbital elements published by NASA, a Monte Carlo method was used to generate parameter sets that bracket the uncertainties in these elements. All simulations, of the orbit, predicted that Eagle would never impact the lunar surface.

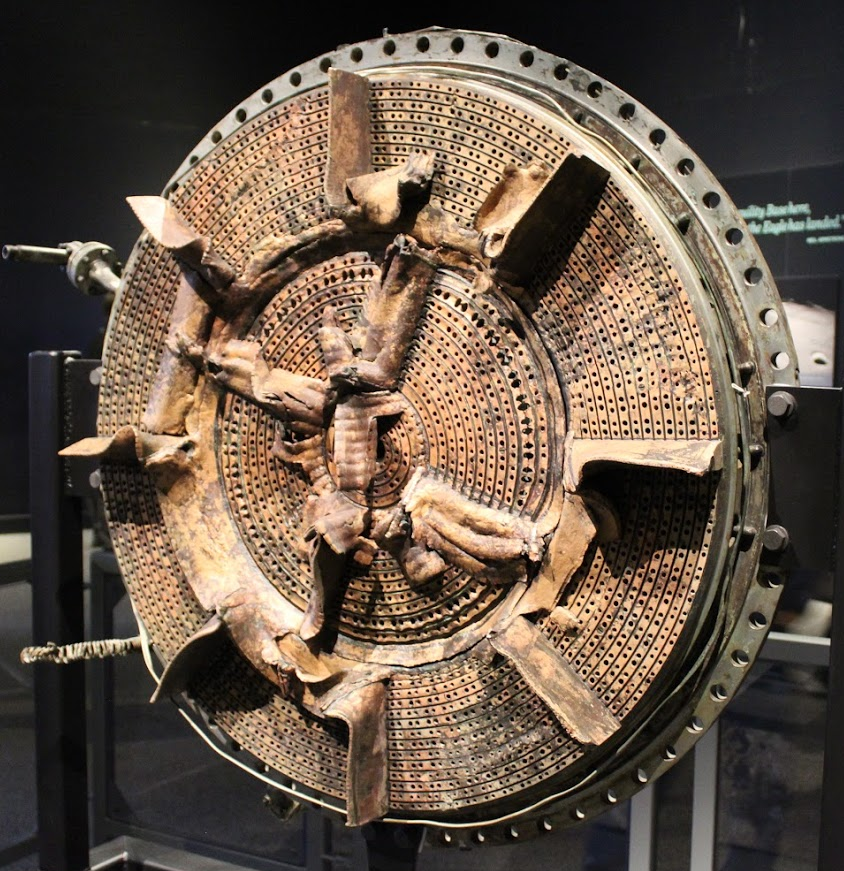
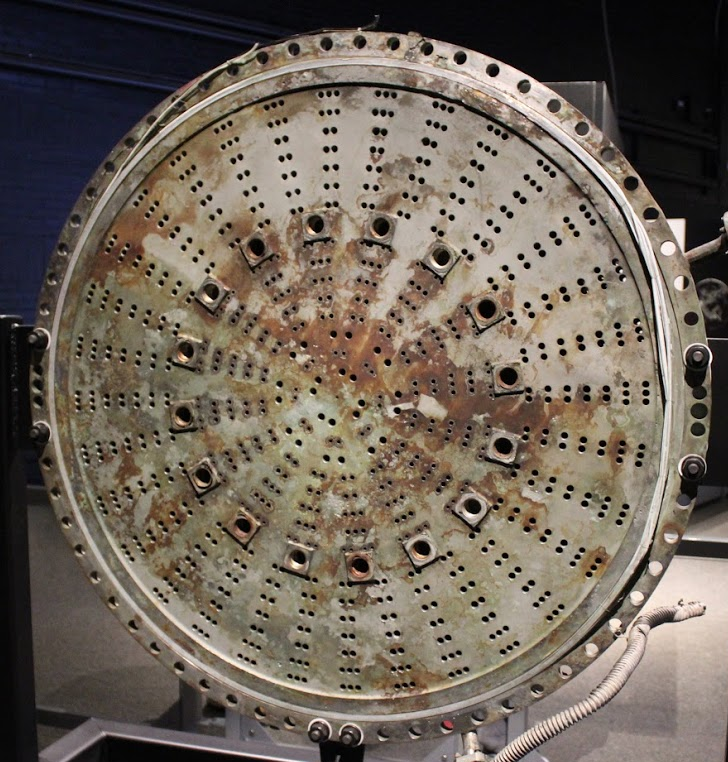
F-1 Engine Injector Plate on temporary display at the Cincinnati Museum Center in 2019

In March 2012 a team of specialists financed by Amazon founder Jeff Bezos located the F-1 engines from the S-IC stage that launched Apollo 11 into space. They were found on the Atlantic seabed using advanced sonar scanning. His team brought parts of two of the five engines to the surface. In July 2013, a conservator discovered a serial number under the rust on one of the engines raised from the Atlantic, which NASA confirmed was from Apollo 11. The S-IVB third stage which performed Apollo 11's trans-lunar injection remains in a solar orbit near to that of Earth.

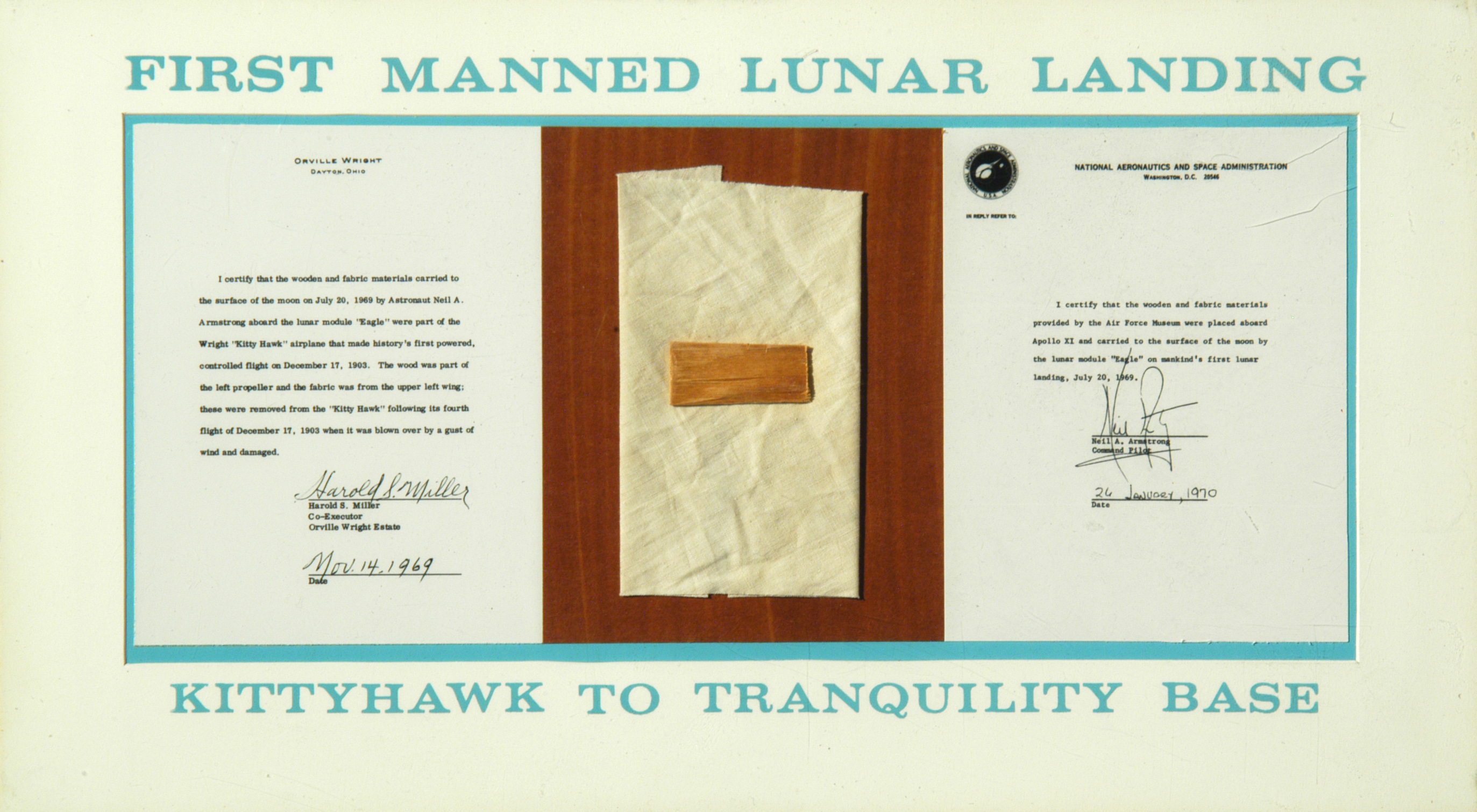
Pieces of fabric and wood from the first airplane, the 1903 Wright Flyer, traveled to the Moon in Apollo 11's Lunar Module Eagle and are displayed at the Wright Brothers National Memorial.

=== Moon rocks ===
The main repository for the Apollo Moon rocks is the Lunar Sample Laboratory Facility at the Lyndon B. Johnson Space Center in Houston, Texas. For safekeeping, there is also a smaller collection stored at White Sands Test Facility near Las Cruces, New Mexico. Most of the rocks are stored in nitrogen to keep them free of moisture. They are handled only indirectly, using special tools. Over 100 research laboratories worldwide conduct studies of the samples; approximately 500 samples are prepared and sent to investigators every year.

In November 1969, Nixon asked NASA to make up about 250 presentation Apollo 11 lunar sample displays for 135 nations, the fifty states of the United States and its possessions, and the United Nations. Each display included Moon dust from Apollo 11 and flags, including one of the Soviet Union, taken along by Apollo 11. The rice-sized particles were four small pieces of Moon soil weighing about 50 mg and were enveloped in a clear acrylic button about as big as a United States half-dollar coin. This acrylic button magnified the grains of lunar dust. Nixon gave the Apollo 11 lunar sample displays as goodwill gifts in 1970.

=== Experiment results ===
The Passive Seismic Experiment ran until the command uplink failed on August 25, 1969. The downlink failed on December 14, 1969. As of 2025, the Lunar Laser Ranging experiment remains operational.

=== Moonwalk camera ===
The Hasselblad camera used during the moonwalk was thought to be lost or left on the Moon's surface.

=== Lunar Module Eagle memorabilia ===
In 2015, after Armstrong died in 2012, his widow contacted the National Air and Space Museum to inform them she had found a white cloth bag in one of Armstrong's closets. The bag contained various items, which should have been left behind in the Lunar Module Eagle, including the 16mm Data Acquisition Camera that had been used to capture images of the first Moon landing. The camera is currently on display at the National Air and Space Museum.

=== Anniversary events ===
==== 40th anniversary ====
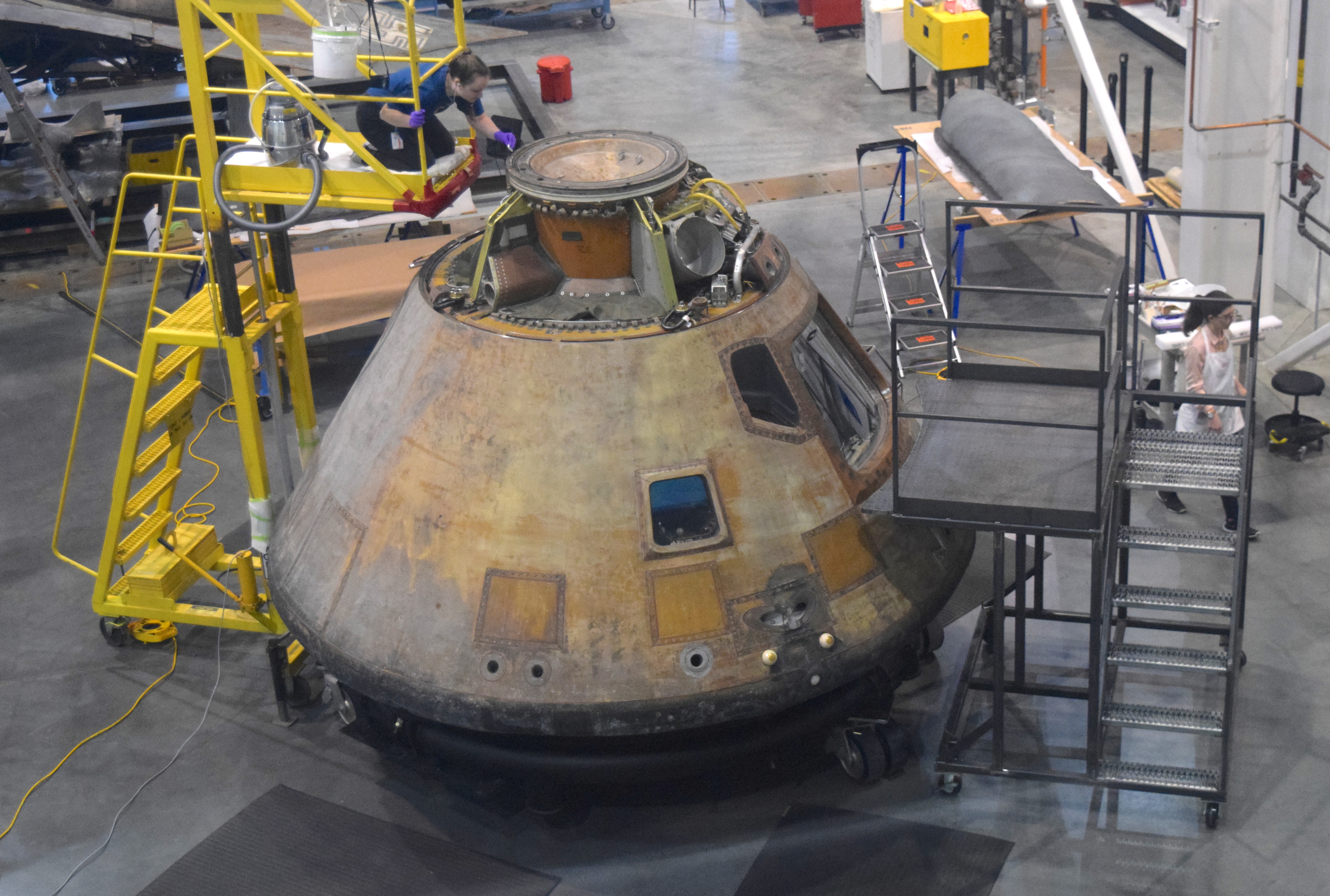
Columbia at the Mary Baker Engen Restoration Hangar

On July 15, 2009, Life.com released a photo gallery of previously unpublished photos of the astronauts taken by Life photographer Ralph Morse prior to the Apollo 11 launch. From July 16 to 24, 2009, NASA streamed the original mission audio on its website in real time 40 years to the minute after the events occurred. It is in the process of restoring the video footage and has released a preview of key moments. In July 2010, air-to-ground voice recordings and film footage shot in Mission Control during the Apollo 11 powered descent and landing was re-synchronized and released for the first time. The John F. Kennedy Presidential Library and Museum set up an Adobe Flash website that rebroadcasts the transmissions of Apollo 11 from launch to landing on the Moon.

On July 20, 2009, Armstrong, Aldrin, and Collins met with President Barack Obama at the White House. "We expect that there is, as we speak, another generation of kids out there who are looking up at the sky and are going to be the next Armstrong, Collins, and Aldrin", Obama said. "We want to make sure that NASA is going to be there for them when they want to take their journey." On August 7, 2009, an act of Congress awarded the three astronauts a Congressional Gold Medal, the highest civilian award in the United States. The bill was sponsored by Florida Senator Bill Nelson and Florida Representative Alan Grayson.

A group of British scientists interviewed as part of the anniversary events reflected on the significance of the Moon landing:

It was carried out in a technically brilliant way with risks taken ... that would be inconceivable in the risk-averse world of today ... The Apollo programme is arguably the greatest technical achievement of mankind to date ... nothing since Apollo has come close [to] the excitement that was generated by those astronauts—Armstrong, Aldrin and the 10 others who followed them.

==== 50th anniversary ====
In June 2015, Congressman Bill Posey introduced resolution H.R. 2726 to the 114th session of the United States House of Representatives directing the United States Mint to design and sell commemorative coins in gold, silver and clad for the 50th anniversary of the Apollo 11 mission. On January 24, 2019, the Mint released the Apollo 11 Fiftieth Anniversary commemorative coins to the public on its website.

A documentary film, Apollo 11, with restored footage of the 1969 event, premiered in IMAX on March 1, 2019, and broadly in theaters on March 8.

The Smithsonian Institute's National Air and Space Museum and NASA sponsored the "Apollo 50 Festival" on the National Mall in Washington DC. The three-day (July 18 to 20, 2019) outdoor festival featured hands-on exhibits and activities, live performances, and speakers such as Adam Savage and NASA scientists.

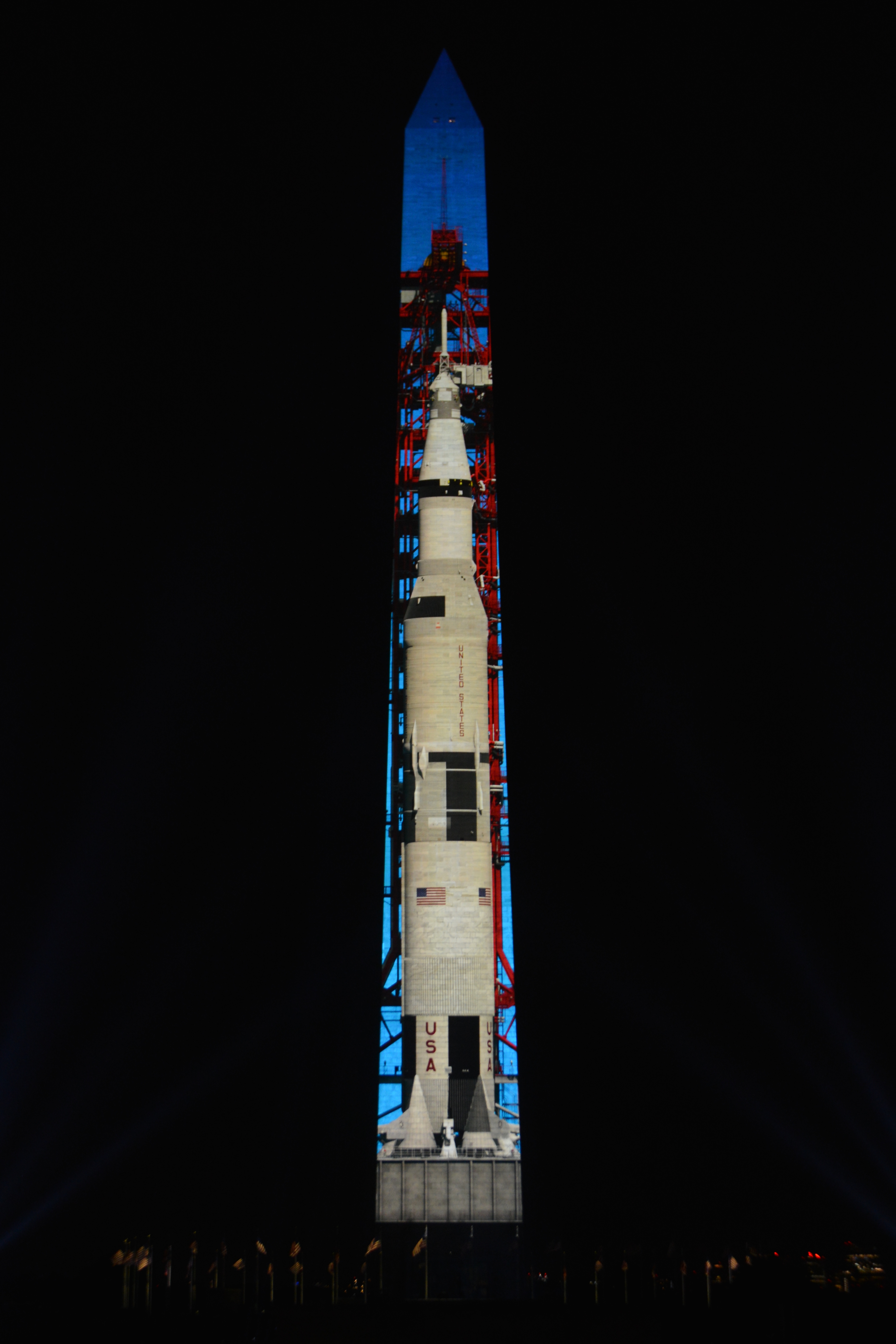
A Saturn V rocket projected onto the Washington Monument during the Apollo 11 50th anniversary show

As part of the festival, a projection of the 363-foot (111 m) tall Saturn V rocket was displayed on the east face of the 555-foot (169 m) tall Washington Monument from July 16 to the 20th from 9:30 pm until 11:30 pm (EDT). The program included a 17-minute show that combined full-motion video projected on the Washington Monument to recreate the assembly and launch of the Saturn V rocket.

The projection was joined by a 40-foot (12 m) wide recreation of the Kennedy Space Center countdown clock and two large video screens showing archival footage to recreate the time leading up to the moon landing. There were three shows per night on July 19–20, with the last show on Saturday, delayed slightly so the portion where Armstrong first set foot on the Moon would happen exactly 50 years to the second after the actual event.

On July 19, 2019, the Google Doodle paid tribute to the Apollo 11 Moon landing, complete with a link to an animated YouTube video with voiceover by astronaut Michael Collins.

Aldrin, Collins, and Armstrong's sons were hosted by President Donald Trump in the Oval Office.

== Films and documentaries ==
- Footprints on the Moon, a 1969 documentary film by Bill Gibson and Barry Coe
- Moonwalk One, a 1971 documentary film by Theo Kamecke
- Apollo 11: As It Happened, a 1994 six-hour documentary on ABC News' coverage of the event
- Apollo 11, a 1996 docudrama
- First Man, 2018 film by Damien Chazelle based on the 2005 James R. Hansen book First Man: The Life of Neil A. Armstrong
- Apollo 11, a 2019 documentary film by Todd Douglas Miller with restored footage of the 1969 event
- Chasing the Moon, a July 2019 PBS three-night six-hour documentary, directed by Robert Stone, examined the events leading up to the mission. An accompanying book of the same name was also released.
- 8 Days: To the Moon and Back, a PBS and BBC Studios 2019 documentary film by Anthony Philipson re-enacting major portions of the mission using mission audio recordings, new studio footage, NASA and news archives, and computer-generated imagery.

== See also ==
- Apollo in Real Time – Interactive website of Apollo 11, 13, and 17
- Exploration of the Moon – Missions to the Moon
- List of missions to the Moon
- List of species that have landed on the Moon
- List of photographs considered the most important
