= USS Hornet (CV-12) =

Essex-class aircraft carrier of the US Navy

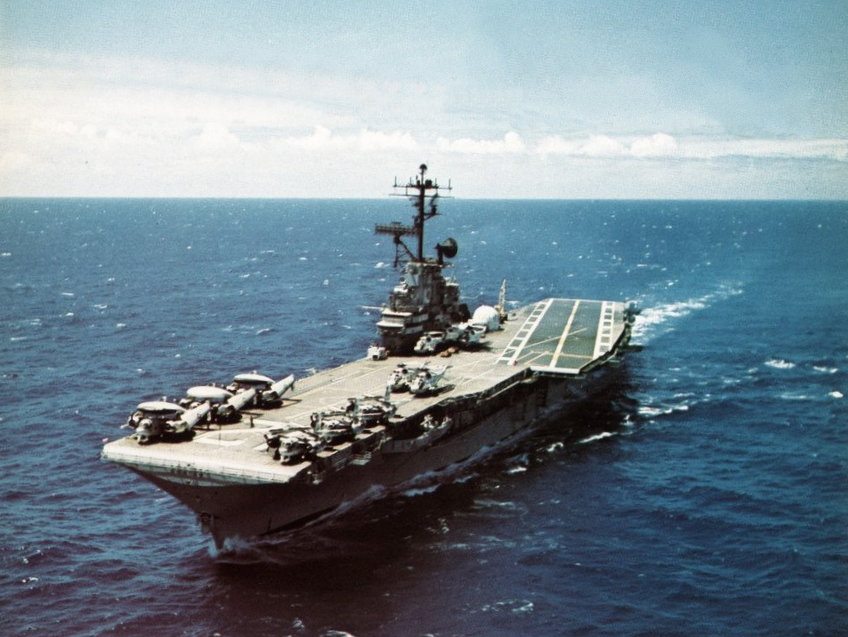
- Hornet in the Pacific Ocean in July 1969

History

United States
- Name: Hornet
- Namesake: Hornet
- Ordered: 20 May 1940
- Awarded: 9 September 1940
- Builder: Newport News Shipbuilding
- Laid down: 3 August 1942
- Launched: 30 August 1943
- Commissioned: 29 November 1943
- Decommissioned: 15 January 1947
- Renamed: From Kearsarge, October 1942
- Identification: Hull number: CV-12
- Recommissioned: 11 September 1953
- Decommissioned: 26 June 1970
- Reclassified: CVA-12, 1 October 1952; CVS-12, 27 June 1958
- Stricken: 25 July 1989
- Honors and awards: See Awards
- Status: Museum ship at the USS Hornet Museum in Alameda, California

General characteristics (as built)
- Class & type: Essex-class aircraft carrier
- Displacement: 27,100 long tons (27,500 t) (standard); 36,380 long tons (36,960 t) (full load)
- Length: 820 feet (249.9 m) (wl); 872 feet (265.8 m) (o/a)
- Beam: 93 ft (28.3 m)
- Draft: 34 ft 2 in (10.41 m)
- Installed power: 8 × Babcock & Wilcox boilers; 150,000 shp (110,000 kW)
- Propulsion: 4 × geared steam turbines; 4 × screw propellers
- Speed: 33 knots (61 km/h; 38 mph)
- Range: 14,100 nmi (26,100 km; 16,200 mi) at 20 knots (37 km/h; 23 mph)
- Complement: 2,600 officers and enlisted men
- Armament: 12 × 5 in (127 mm) DP guns; 32 × 40 mm (1.6 in) AA guns; 46 × 20 mm (0.8 in) AA guns
- Armor: Waterline belt: 2.5–4 in (64–102 mm); Deck: 1.5 in (38 mm); Hangar deck: 2.5 in (64 mm); Bulkheads: 4 in (102 mm)
- Aircraft carried: 36 × Grumman F4F Wildcat; 36 × Douglas SBD Dauntless; 18 × Grumman TBF Avenger

USS Hornet (CV/CVA/CVS-12) is an Essex-class aircraft carrier built for the United States Navy (USN) during World War II. Completed in late 1943, the ship was assigned to the Fast Carrier Task Force (variously designated as Task Force 38 or 58) in the Pacific Ocean, the navy's primary offensive force during the Pacific War. The ship was also used to recover the Apollo 11 and Apollo 12 crews.

In early 1944, she participated in attacks on Japanese installations in New Guinea, Palau and Truk among others. Hornet then took part in the Mariana and Palau Islands campaign and most of the subsidiary operations, most notably the Battle of the Philippine Sea in June that was nicknamed the "Great Marianas Turkey Shoot" for the disproportionate losses inflicted upon the Japanese. The ship then participated in the Philippines Campaign in late 1944, and the Volcano and Ryukyu Islands campaign in the first half of 1945. She was badly damaged by Typhoon Connie in June and had to return to the United States for repairs.

After the war she took part in Operation Magic Carpet, returning troops to the U.S. and was then placed in reserve in 1946. Hornet was reactivated during the Korean War of 1950–1953, but spent the rest of the war being modernized to allow her to operate jet-propelled aircraft. The ship was modernized again in the late 1950s for service as an anti-submarine carrier. She played a minor role in the Vietnam War during the 1960s and in the Apollo program, recovering the Apollo 11 and Apollo 12 astronauts when they returned from the Moon.

Hornet was decommissioned in 1970. She was eventually designated as both a National Historic Landmark and a California Historical Landmark, and she opened to the public as the USS Hornet Museum in Alameda, California, in 1998.

== Design and description ==
The Essex-class ships were much larger than the preceding Yorktown-class aircraft carriers, which allowed them to carry more aircraft, armor, and armament. The initial ships had a length of 872 feet (265.8 m) overall and 820 feet (249.9 m) at the waterline, although this was revised to an overall length of 888 feet (270.7 m) in the "long-hull" sub-class when the bow was reshaped to accommodate a pair of quadruple 40-millimeter (1.6 in) mounts in the bow compared to the single mount in the earlier "short-hull" ships like Hornet.

All of the ships had a beam of 93 feet (28.3 m) at the waterline and a draft of 30 feet 10 inches (9.4 m) at deep load. They displaced 27,100 long tons (27,535 t) at standard load and 36,380 long tons (36,960 t) at deep load. Their designed complement was approximately 268 officers and 2,362 enlisted men, but more men were added even before the ships were completed; the addition of more light weapons and other equipment greatly increased the overcrowding so that Hornet's sister Intrepid had a crew of 382 officers and 3,003 enlisted men in 1945. The ships had four geared steam turbines, each driving one shaft, using steam supplied by eight Babcock & Wilcox boilers. The turbines were designed to produce a total of 150,000 shaft horsepower (110,000 kW), enough to give a maximum speed of 33 knots (61 km/h; 38 mph). The ships carried enough fuel oil to give them a range of 14,100 nautical miles (26,100 km; 16,200 mi) at 20 knots (37 km/h; 23 mph).

=== Flight deck arrangements ===
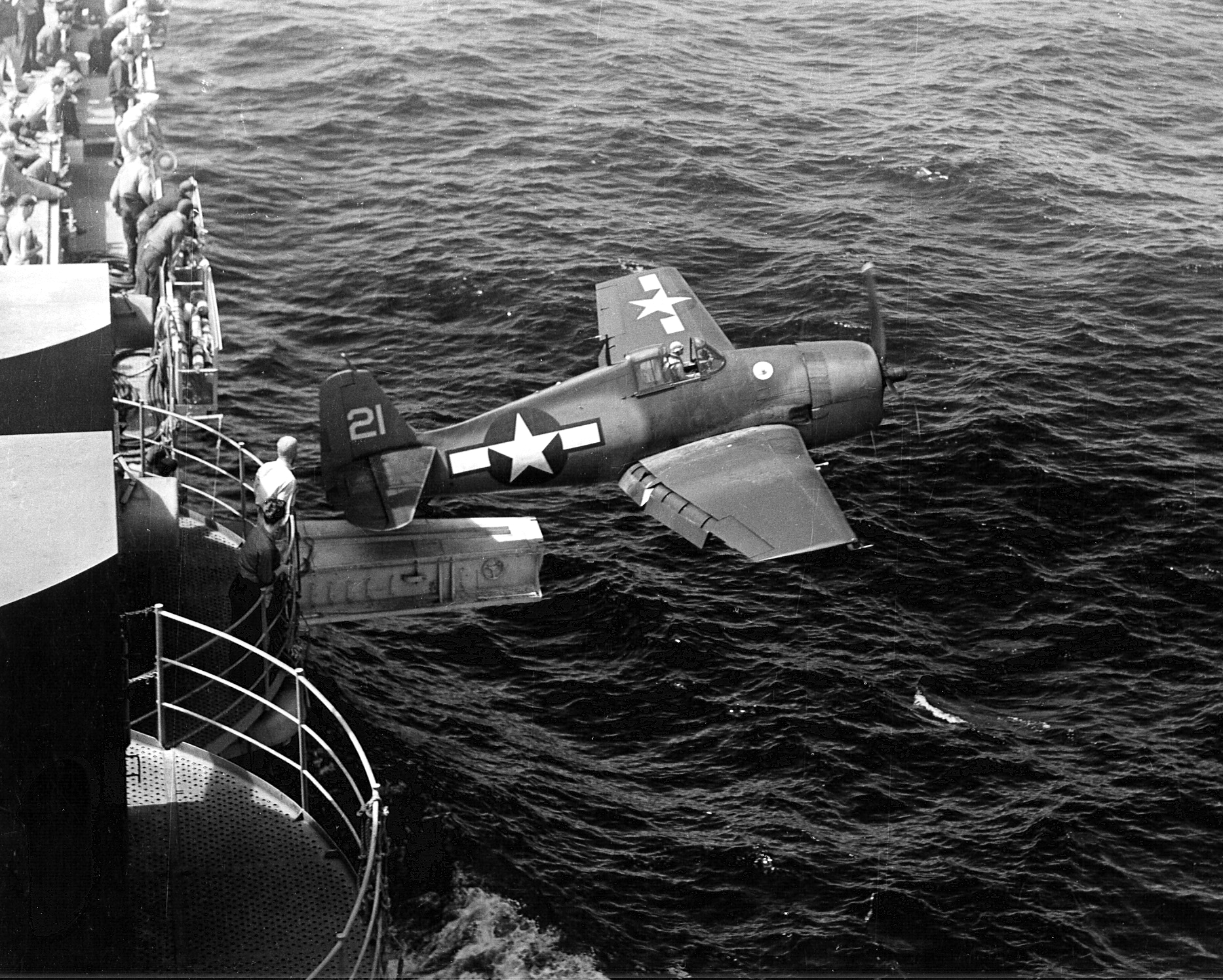
Grumman F6F-3 Hellcat fighter of VF-15 being catapulted from Hornet via the hangar catapult, 25 February 1944

The short-hull Essexes had a flight deck that was 862 feet (262.7 m) long and had a maximum width of 108 feet (32.9 m). Below it was a 654 by 70 feet (199.3 m × 21.3 m) hangar with a height of 18 feet (5.5 m). The hangar was connected to the flight deck by three aircraft elevators, two in the flight deck and a folding one on the port side of the flight deck, abreast the island. Catapult arrangements for the early Essexs varied between ships; Hornet was built with a single hydraulic catapult on the forward part of the flight deck and another was fitted transversely on the hangar deck. All of the Essexs were fitted with arresting gear to allow them to land aircraft over both the stern and the bow.

Early in the design process, the Essexs were intended to carry over 100 aircraft: 27 fighters, 37 scout or dive bombers, 18 torpedo bombers, three observation and two utility aircraft, plus 21 partially disassembled spares. Early war experience increased the number of fighters to 36 at the expense of the observation and utility aircraft and reduced the number of spares to nine. By mid-1945, the air group typically consisted of 36 or 37 fighters, an equal number of fighter bombers, and dive and torpedo squadrons of 15 aircraft apiece for a total of 103. By this time, the fighter squadrons included specialist photo-reconnaissance and night fighter aircraft.

=== Armament, armor and electronics ===
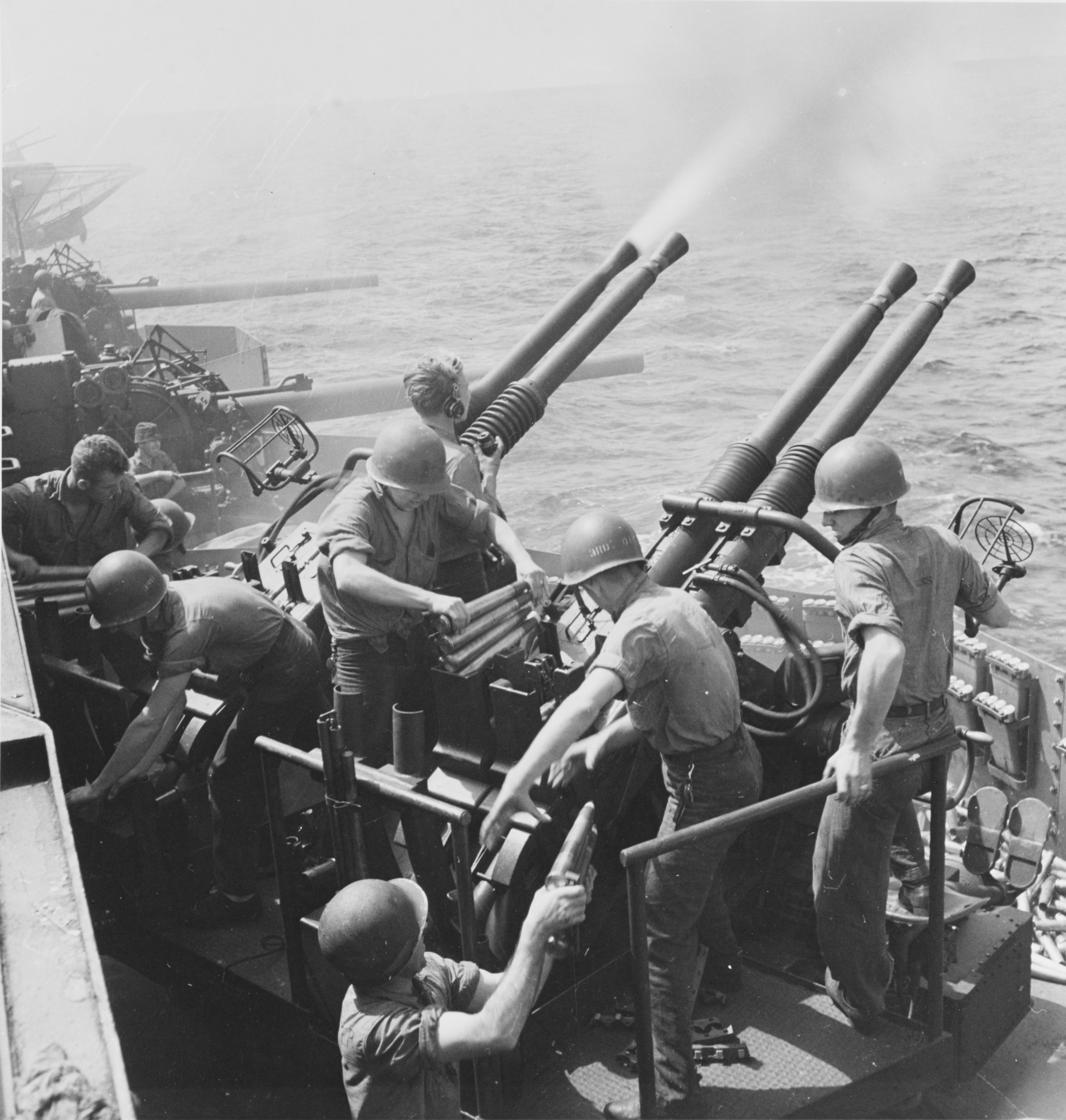
One of Hornet's quadruple 40 mm Bofors mounts firing under remote control, 16 February 1945

The main armament of the Essex-class ships consisted of a dozen 38-caliber 5-inch (127 mm) dual-purpose guns arranged in two superfiring pairs of twin-gun turrets fore and aft of the island and four guns in single mounts on the port side of the flight deck. These guns were controlled by a pair of Mk 37 directors, mounted on the top of the island; each director was fitted with a Mk 4 fire-control radar. The early short-hull Essexs were equipped with eight quadruple 40-millimeter (1.6 in) Bofors anti-aircraft (AA) guns; one mount each at the bow and stern, four atop the island and two on the port side of the flight deck, next to the 5-inch guns. Each mount was controlled by its own Mk 51 director. The carriers were also fitted with 46 Oerlikon 20-millimeter (0.8 in) light AA guns on single mounts along the sides of the flight deck and on the island.

The waterline armor belt of the carriers was 10 feet (3 m) high, 508 feet (155 m) long and covered the middle 62% of the hull. It was 4 inches (102 mm) thick, tapering to 2.5 inches (64 mm) at its bottom edge. The hangar deck was also 2.5 inches thick and the protective deck below it was 1.5 inches (38 mm) thick. Transverse 4-inch bulkheads closed off the ends of the belt armor to form the ship's armored citadel. The steering gear was protected by 2.5-inches of special treatment steel.

The Essex-class carriers were designed with little space reserved for radar and the additional systems added while under construction contributed to the general overcrowding of the crew and the cramped island of the ships. Hornet was completed with most of her radars mounted on the tripod mast atop her island. It carried the SK early-warning radar, SM height-finding radar and the SG surface search radar. A SC early-warning radar was positioned on a stub lattice mast on the starboard side of the funnel.

=== Wartime modifications ===
Changes to the numbers of 20 mm guns aboard Hornet during the war are not available in the sources, although she had 35 single mounts by the end of the war. The ship did not return to any naval base in Hawaii or the West Coast until July 1945 when she arrived at San Francisco, California, for repairs for her typhoon damage, so it is unlikely that any major modifications were done before then. Facilities in Ulithi Atoll were limited, but they had been able to install some of the new equipment that was fielded in late 1944 and 1945. Some of the ship's Mk 51 directors may have been replaced by Mk 57 directors with an integral Mk 34 fire-control radar and the Mk 4 fire-control radar atop the Mk 37 directors may have been upgraded to a Mk 12 system that shared its mount with a Mk 22 height finder. The SP height finder was a lighter version of the SM and began to be installed in Essex-class ships in March 1945.

While being repaired, the Navy took the opportunity to refit the ship to the latest standard. Her SK radar was upgraded to a SK-2 model with a dish antenna that improved its performance and her hangar-deck catapult was replaced by one on the flight deck. Her island was remodeled to expand the flag bridge which caused the removal of the forward lower 40 mm mount on the island and 10 new quadruple mounts were added along the sides of the flight deck and the hull for a total of 68 guns in 17 mounts.

== Construction and career ==
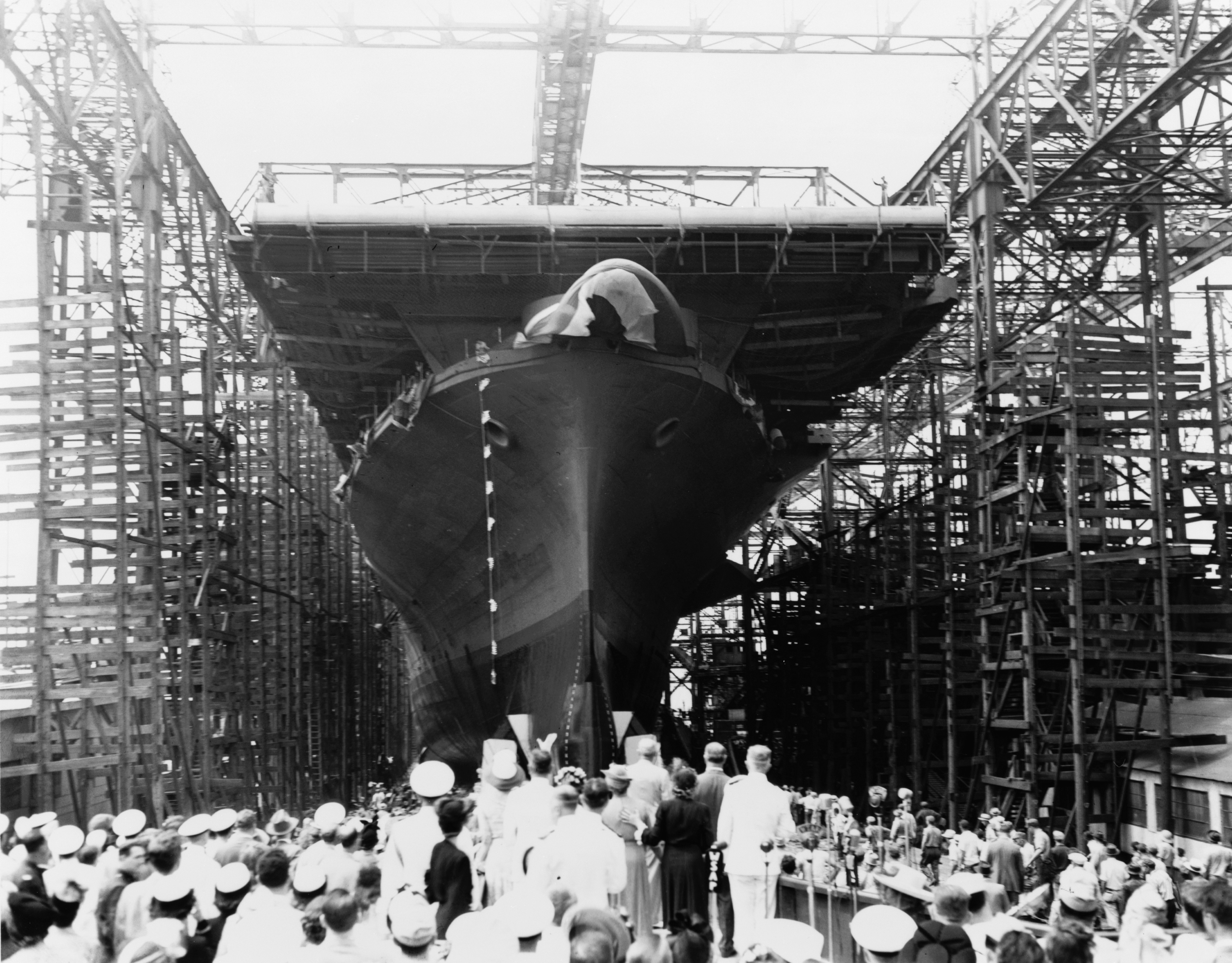
Launching ceremony of Hornet, 30 August 1943

The Chief of Naval Operations had ordered three Essex-class carriers on 10 May 1940 in anticipation of Congress passing the Two-Ocean Navy Act, although the ship that later became Hornet originally had the name Kearsarge with the hull number of CV-12. The contract to build her was awarded to Newport News Shipbuilding on 9 September 1940, and her keel was laid down on 3 August 1942. The seventh Hornet (CV-8) was sunk in the Battle of Santa Cruz on 26 October 1942, and the CV-12 hull was renamed Hornet shortly afterwards. The ship was launched on 30 August 1943 with her sponsor being Annie Reid Knox, wife of Secretary of the Navy Frank Knox. She was commissioned on 29 November 1943 with Captain Miles R. Browning in command.

Hornet worked up off Bermuda before departing Norfolk, Virginia, on 14 February 1944 to join Task Force 58 at Majuro Atoll in the Marshall Islands where she arrived on 20 March. Two days later the Task Force departed to attack warships and airfields in the Palau Islands and the Kossol Roads to eliminate any threat to the scheduled operations in New Guinea and the Admiralty Islands. To block the exits from Kossol and trap all of the ships inside the lagoon, the torpedo bomber squadrons from Hornet and her sisters Lexington and Bunker Hill had trained on aerial minelaying. To avoid detection, the American ships steamed far south of the Japanese naval base at Truk. They were spotted on the 28th and Admiral Mineichi Koga, commander of the Combined Fleet, ordered his warships to withdraw to Tawi-Tawi Island in the Philippines and for the merchant shipping to disperse.

As Task Force 58 approached its targets on the morning of 30 March, its carriers launched a fighter sweep that shot down 30 Mitsubishi A6M Zero fighters already airborne and they were soon followed by 39 Grumman TBF Avenger torpedo bombers, each of which carried a pair of magnetic mines that effectively bottled up the 40-odd ships in Kossol Roads. This was the first and only time that carrier aircraft laid mines during the Pacific War. Despite reinforcing fighters that flew in overnight, the Americans sank 24 merchant and auxiliary ships, totaling nearly 130,000 gross register tons (GRT) of shipping, plus two old destroyers, four subchasers and a pair of repair ships on 30 and 31 March. American pilots claimed to have shot down 63 aircraft and destroyed over 100 more on the ground while losing 25 aircraft of their own. On their way back to Majuro, the carriers attacked targets on Woleai on 1 April to little effect.

Before Task Force 58 departed Majuro on 13 April, Rear Admiral Joseph J. Clark had hoisted his flag in Hornet as commander of Task Group 58.1 that consisted of his flagship and the three Independence-class light carriers, Cowpens, Belleau Wood and Bataan. The task group was ordered to attack Sarmi, Sawar, and Wakde Airfields in Western New Guinea while the other task groups supported the amphibious landings at Hollandia. There was little Japanese air activity while the ships were off New Guinea, although the Task Group's fighters did shoot down two Mitsubishi G4M (Allied reporting name "Betty") bombers that were searching for them. Task Force 58 withdrew to Seeadler Harbor on Manus Island on 25 April to replenish for a few days before leaving to attack the shore facilities at Truk. The Japanese spotted the ships during the night of 28/29 April, but their weak attack later that morning was ineffective and the 84 Grumman F6F Hellcats of the morning fighter sweep were opposed by about 60 Zeros. Bad weather and a heavy overcast prevented the Americans from gaining complete air superiority until the mid-afternoon, but they were able to severely damage the naval base's infrastructure over the next two days. They lost 9 aircraft in accidents and 27 in combat, mostly to anti-aircraft fire while claiming 59 aircraft in the air and 34 on the ground.

En route to Majuro, Task Group 58.1 was detached to cover the bombardments of the airfields at Satawan and Ponape by the portions of the Task Force's escorting ships. Both islands had already been previously attacked and little additional damage appears to have been done in exchange for the loss of one aircraft shot down by AA guns. Task Force 58 arrived at Majuro on 4 May and spent the next month preparing for the Mariana and Palau Islands campaign. The abrasive Browning had made many enemies and his mistakes led him to be relieved for cause on 29 May; he was replaced by Captain William Sample.

=== Mariana and Palau Islands campaign ===
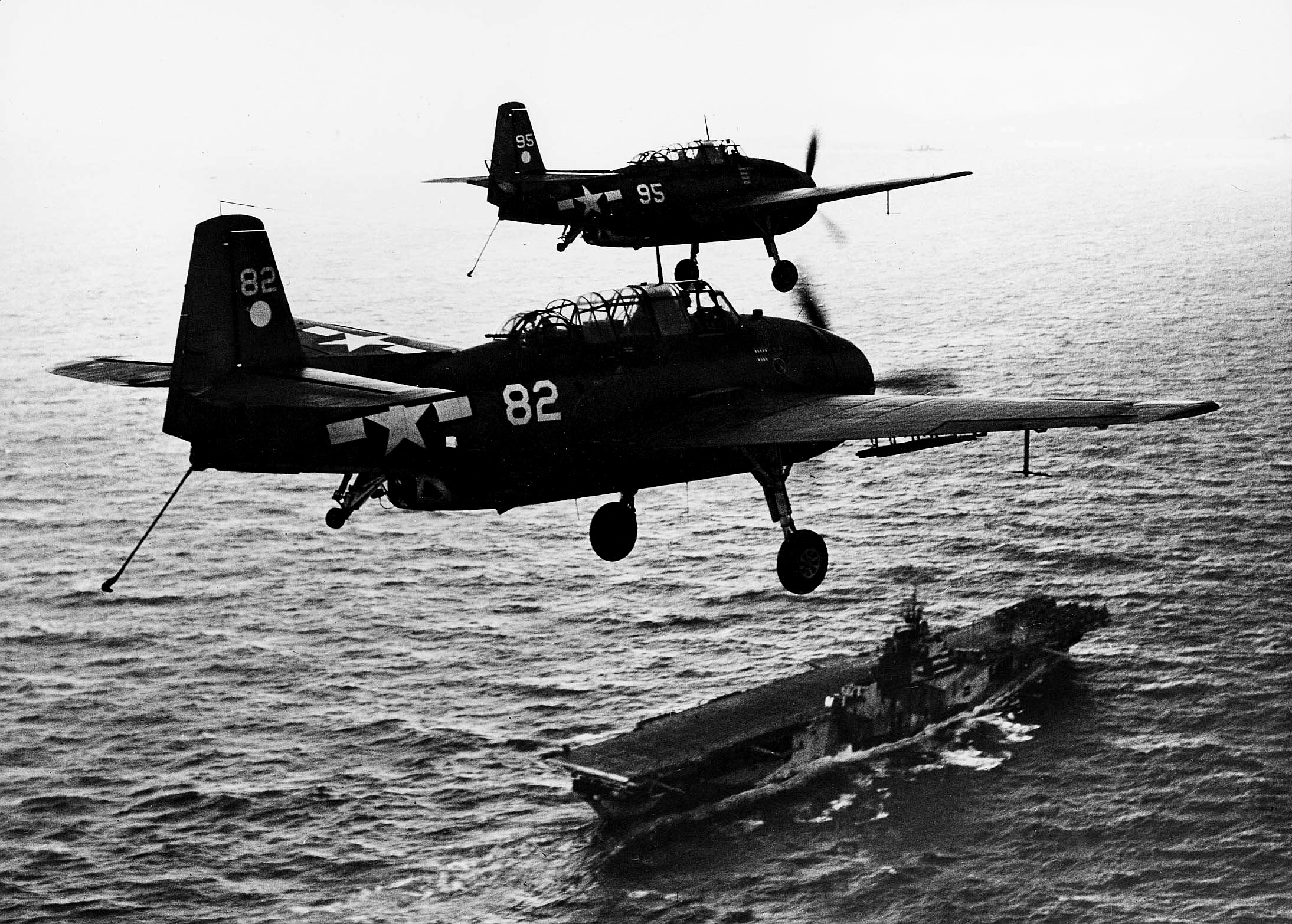
Avengers belonging to Torpedo Squadron 2 (VT-2) overflying Hornet, mid-1944

By June Hornet's air group (Carrier Air Group 2 (CVG-2)) mustered 40 Hellcat fighters, including 4 night-fighter versions, 33 Curtiss SB2C Helldiver dive bombers and 20 Avengers. Task Group 58.1 had exchanged Cowpens for Hornet's sister Yorktown so it mustered a pair each of fleet and light carriers for the campaign. Task Force 58 departed Majuro on 6 June in time to begin the air strikes on the southern Marianas six days later, three days prior to the planned amphibious assault on Saipan, although the Japanese discovered that it had left Majuro on 8 June. Hornet's night fighters began shooting down Japanese reconnaissance aircraft on the night of 10 June. Vice Admiral Marc Mitscher, commander of the task force, decided to move the air strikes forward to 11 June, hoping to catch the Japanese off guard.

The task group's fighters discovered 30 Zeros over Guam during their sweep and claimed to have shot them all down, with Hornet's 16 Hellcats claiming 23 of them as kills. A picket line of destroyers was stationed between the carriers and Guam and they controlled interceptions by the task group's fighters of about a dozen reconnaissance and attack aircraft that afternoon. The following days the task group continued to attack Guam to eliminate all of the aircraft based there as well as any reinforcements. Later that afternoon, Hornet's aircraft discovered a seven-ship reinforcement convoy east of Guam, but it was too far away to attack if the aircraft were to land during daylight. That night the task group closed the distance while the convoy continued to approach Guam and was only 80 nmi (150 km; 92 mi) when it launched 20 bomb-armed Hellcats. Their pilots were not trained for anti-shipping missions and failed to significantly damage the ships of the convoy before it reached Guam.

The new commander of the Combined Fleet, Admiral Soemu Toyoda, was uncertain if the Americans were merely attacking the Japanese facilities in the Marianas until the fast battleships escorting Task Force 58 were detached to make a preliminary bombardment of Saipan on 13 June. Even before he received the report of the bombardment, he ordered the 1st Mobile Fleet to move forward to Guimaras Island to start training their inexperienced aviators in a more protected environment. He then alerted all forces to prepare to implement Plan A-Go, effective on 19 June, once he had word of the bombardment. The plan was intended to inflict a decisive defeat on the USN and cause the American government to sue for peace after the collapse of public will to continue the war. An American submarine spotted the movement and alerted Vice Admiral Raymond Spruance, commander of the entire operation. Not knowing the Japanese intentions, he believed that the Japanese ships would not be able to attack before 17 June. To take advantage of this window of opportunity to destroy Japanese aerial reinforcements gathering in the Bonin Islands, Spruance ordered Task Groups 58.1 and 58.4 to rendezvous on the 14th, attack the airbases there the following day and return in time to concentrate for the battle that he expected on the 17th.

On 15 June, fighters from the two task groups conducted fighter sweeps over Iwo Jima, Hahajima and Chichi Jima, claiming to have shot down 20 Zeros over Iwo Jima for the loss of two Hellcats. Clark stationed his nightfighters over Iwo Jima that night to prevent the Japanese from launching reconnaissance missions or air strikes before launching more air strikes on the 16th. The bulk of the reinforcements intended for A-Go were still in Japan at this time, but the American carriers claimed to have destroyed a total of 81 aircraft, including 40 in the air, for the loss of four aircraft in combat and seven others in crashes, before departing the area later that afternoon.

==== Battle of the Philippine Sea ====
Map of the Battle of the Philippine Sea (19–20 June 1944)

Vice Admiral Jisaburō Ozawa, commander of the 1st Mobile Fleet, ordered A-Go to begin on 16 April while he concentrated and refueled his forces east of the Philippines. At nightfall on the 17th his ships were spotted by an American submarine some 900 nmi (1,700 km; 1,000 mi) west of Saipan, although Spruance did not receive its report until the early morning of 18 June. Japanese reconnaissance aircraft located Task Force 58 on that afternoon, but the shorter-ranged American aircraft failed to find the Japanese carriers. Ozawa decided to attack on the 19th rather than subject his inexperienced pilots to night landings that they had not trained for and turned south to keep the range from the Americans constant. Spruance had no idea where the Japanese were until a radio transmission from Ozawa was triangulated at a point 410 nmi (760 km; 470 mi) west of his task force on the night of the 18th. A radar-equipped Martin PBM Mariner patrol bomber discovered the 1st Mobile Fleet at 01:15 on 19 June, but its message was not received for another eight hours due to radio troubles. The early morning searches by the Americans were not successful, but the Japanese had been tracking them continuously since 01:00.

That night the Americans had tracked reinforcements flying from Truk to Guam and Mitscher ordered fighters from Task Group 58.1 to patrol over Orote Field. Hellcats from Belleau Wood were the first to engage Japanese aircraft taking off at 07:00 and they had to be reinforced by fighters from Hornet and Yorktown. By 09:30 they had claimed to have shot down 45 fighters and 5 other aircraft while only losing a pair of Hellcats. At that time Hornet launched an air strike of 17 Helldivers and 7 Avengers, escorted by a dozen Hellcats, that bombed Orote without encountering Japanese aircraft. At 09:50 an incoming Japanese air strike had been picked up on radar and the carriers turned into the wind to begin launching 140 fighters; at 10:04, the fighters patrolling over Guam were summoned to reinforce the Combat Air Patrol (CAP) over Task Force 58, although they were too late to participate in the aerial battle. The CAP, reinforced by the newly launched Hellcats, intercepted the Japanese, shooting down 40 of the 57 Zeros involved and seriously disrupting the Japanese attack which only inflicted minor damage on one battleship. Hornet contributed Hellcats who claimed to have shot down nine Zeros and three Nakajima B6N "Jill" torpedo bombers. The second wave of aircraft was detected at 11:07, but Hornet's fighters did not participate in their defeat. The third wave was given erroneous locations for the American ships and were 120 nmi (220 km; 140 mi) northwest of them at 12:40. Most of them turned back, but about a dozen did not and were detected by Task Group 58.1 at 12:56. They were intercepted by 17 Hellcats from Hornet and Yorktown which shot down six Zeros and a Jill, with Hornet's fighters claiming nine aircraft in exchange for a damaged Hellcat. The fourth wave was also misdirected and most of the aircraft decided to continue onwards and land on Guam. They arrived there around 15:00 and were intercepted by 41 Hellcats from Hornet, her sister Essex, Cowpens and Enterprise. They shot down 40 of the 49 aircraft; two of Hornet's pilots shot down five Japanese aircraft as they were attempting to land.

A group of 295 Hellcats, together with five Avengers and Dauntlesses, had engaged the Japanese during the day and they shot down 208 aircraft of the 373 flown off by the carriers. The Americans lost seven Hellcats at sea, nine over Guam and six by accidents; seven bombers had been shot down by AA guns over Guam and two others had crashed. All told they lost 31 aircraft to all causes during the day. The Japanese lost 35 aircraft in accidents and aboard the two carriers sunk by submarines during the battle, together with 18 Guam-based aircraft shot down and 52 destroyed on the ground for a grand total of 313 to all causes, an exchange ratio of almost exactly 10:1 in favor of the Americans. Not without cause did they nickname the battle "The Marianas Turkey Shoot".

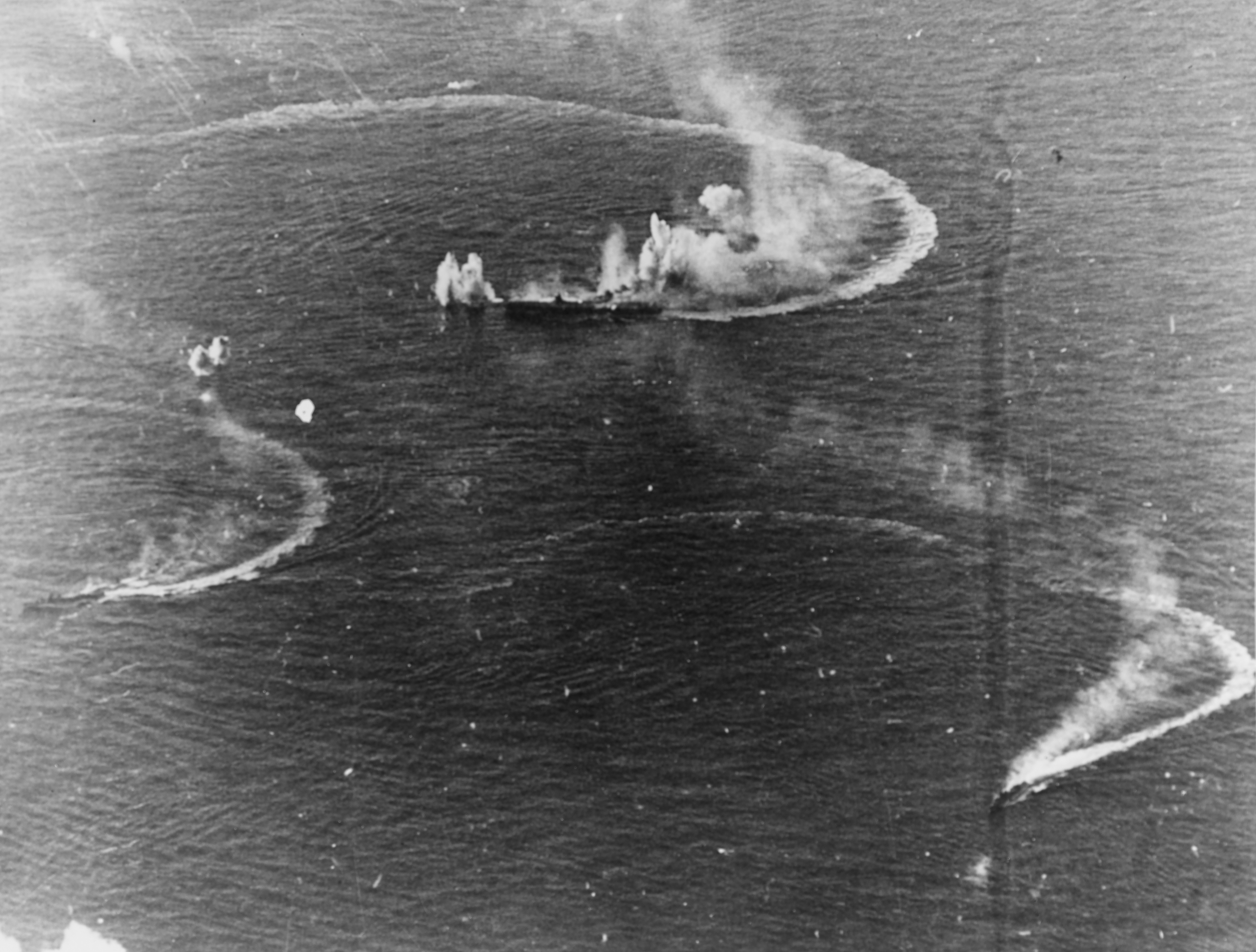
Zuikaku (upper center) and a pair of destroyers under attack by Hornet's Helldivers, 20 June 1944

At dusk, the Japanese turned away to the northwest to regroup and to refuel and the Americans turned west to close the distance. They discovered the retiring Japanese fleet during the afternoon of the following day and Mitscher ordered an air strike launched even though it meant recovering the aircraft at night. It consisted of 54 Avengers and 51 Helldivers, escorted by 85 Hellcats. The Japanese carriers launched their remaining 68 Zeros of which all but three were shot down for the loss of 20 American aircraft to all causes. Hornet's aircraft badly damaged the carrier Zuikaku while the other aircraft sank the carrier Hiyō, two tankers and lightly damaged three other carriers and a few other ships. Clark ordered his task group to turn on their lights to guide his pilots home before Mitscher ordered the entire task force to do the same. Despite these precautions, six Hellcats, 35 Helldivers and 28 Avengers were lost in deck-landing accidents or ran out of fuel, although most of their crews were rescued that night or over the next few days.

=== Follow-on attacks ===
After refuelling on 22 June, most of Task Force 58 sailed to Eniwetok in the Marshall Islands, but Clark took his task group north to attack the Bonins again to interdict any reinforcements for the Marianas. A reconnaissance aircraft spotted his ships on the morning of the 22nd and alerted the Japanese defenders. They scrambled about 60 Zeros and a few Yokosuka D4Y "Judy" dive bombers to intercept the inbound 51 Hellcats. They shot down 6 Hellcats for the loss of 24 Zeros and 5 Judys. The Japanese had enough remaining aircraft to mount two attacks against the task group. The first airstrike of about 20 torpedo bombers had every aircraft shot down by fighters and anti-aircraft fire and the second of 23 Zeros, 9 Judys and 9 Jills never found the American ships. They were intercepted and the Hellcats shot down 10 Zeros and 7 Jills.

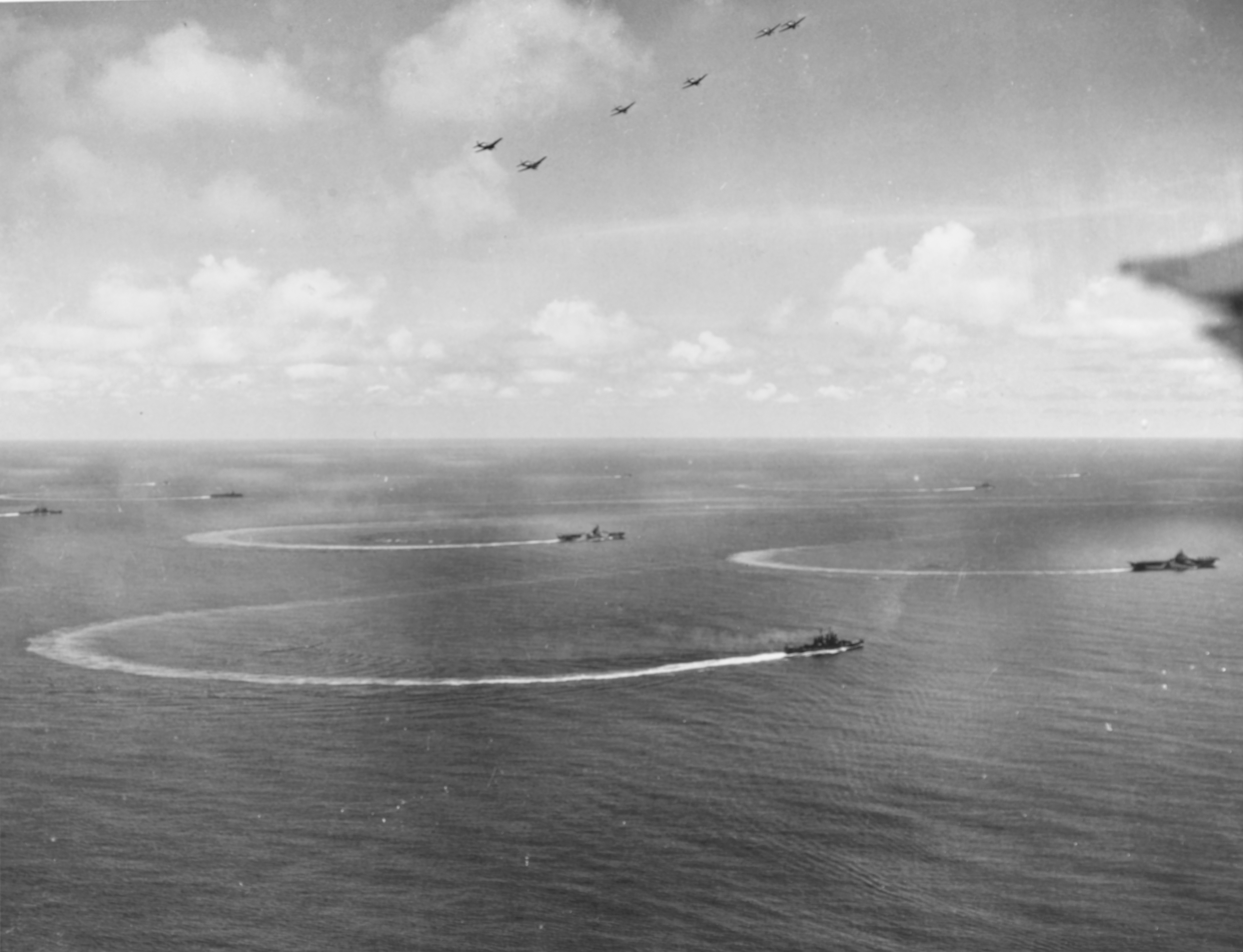
Task Group 58.1 reversing course during the attack on Yap, 28 July 1944. Hornet is in the center, with the light carrier Cabot in the left middle distance and Yorktown at right. Seven Hellcats are overhead.

The task group arrived at Eniwetok on 27 June and departed to attack the Bonins again three days later, now reinforced by Task Group 58.2. They attacked on 3–4 July; the surviving nine Zeros and eight torpedo bombers attempt to do equal damage to their enemy, but lost five Zeros and seven bombers without inflicting any damage on the ships. The task groups relieved Task Group 58.4, which had been supporting the fighting on Saipan, and remained there a week before returning to Eniwetok. In late July, Task Group 58.1 attacked Japanese bases in Yap and nearby islands before attacking the Bonins again on 4–5 August; it arrived back at Eniwetok on the 9th.

That same day, Sample was relieved to take command of a carrier division and Captain Austin Doyle replaced him. Unwilling to serve under Vice Admiral William Halsey, Clark hauled down his flag and was relieved by Vice Admiral John McCain on 18 August. Clark remained aboard Hornet to assist McCain however he might and to serve as the reserve carrier-experienced admiral in case of need. Eight days later, Halsey relieved Spruance and Task Force 58 was redesignated as Task Force 38.

In a strategy conference in Pearl Harbor in July, President Franklin Roosevelt agreed with General Douglas MacArthur that the Philippines, an American territory, would be liberated and they set the date for 20 December. This required a series of preliminary operations to assault the Japanese bases in the western Caroline Islands and the approaches to the Philippines, including Yap and the Palaus. Mitscher began the process by taking three of his task groups, including Hornet's TG 38.1, to attack the Palaus on 6–8 September before moving further west to attack Mindanao on 9–10 September, the southernmost large island of the Philippines. Encouraged by the lack of opposition, Halsey ordered Mitscher to attack the central Philippine islands, including Leyte and the other Visayan Islands. Resistance was weak during the attacks on 12–13 September and the American pilots claimed 173 aircraft shot down, 305 destroyed on the ground and 59 ships sunk for the loss of 9 aircraft to all causes. The reality was slightly different, the First Air Fleet defending the central Philippines had a strength of 176 aircraft before the American attacks and 85 after them; the Imperial Japanese Army Air Force (IJAAF) lost 31–40 aircraft during the attacks.

One of Hornet's Hellcats was shot down off Leyte on 10 September. The pilot was rescued by Filipino fishermen and he had been contacted by members of the Filipino Resistance and informed that there was no Japanese garrison on Leyte. Halsey, coupling this information with the weak resistance put up by the Japanese during his raids on the Philippines, believed that most of the preliminary attacks planned before invading Luzon on 20 December, could be skipped and suggested to the Joint Chiefs of Staff that the landing date be moved forward to 20 October. They agreed, although Admiral Chester Nimitz, commander of the Pacific Fleet, still required that he should conduct those parts of the plan regarding seizing bases in the Palaus and the Western Carolines.

Halsey sent TG 38.1 south to attack Japanese airfields in the area during the invasion of Morotai that began on the 15th, but summoned them back to rejoin the bulk of TF 38 before his planned attack on Manila on 21 September. Hornet's aircraft participated in the second wave of attacks on Manila Bay and sank the elderly destroyer Satsuki. The American pilots claimed to have shot down 110 aircraft and destroyed 95 on the ground, although the First Air Fleet actually lost less than two dozen aircraft to all causes. TF38 claimed to have sunk or damaged seven oil tankers, but Japanese records show that nine were sunk or wrecked. Bad weather forced the cancellation of most of the airstrikes planned for the second day, but Halsey decided to attack Coron Bay in the Calamian Islands instead, an anchorage often used by Japanese oilers, on the other side of the Philippines with TGs 38.1 and 38.3. Hornet's air group led the combined airstrike which sank two oilers, six freighters, several escorts and the seaplane tender Akitsushima. TG 38.1 then sailed to Seeadler Harbor to replenish and exchange Air Group 2 for Air Group 11. Clark finally departed Hornet on 1 October.

=== Liberation of the Philippines ===
The four carrier groups of TF 38 rendezvoused west of the Marianas on 7 October, after weathering a typhoon that inflicted only minor damage. At this time, Hornet's Air Group 11 consisted of 39 Hellcats, 25 Helldivers and 18 Avengers. After refueling the following day, they proceeded north with the mission of destroying Japanese aircraft that could reinforce the defenses of the Philippines. Analysis of American radio traffic had alerted the Japanese and they were expecting an attack along the arc between the Ryukyu Islands and Formosa or in the northern Philippines. The Americans obliged with an attack on the Ryukyus on 10 October, claiming to have shot down over 100 aircraft while losing 21 of their own to all causes. This attack caused the Japanese to activate the Sho-1 and Sho-2 variants of their plan that provided for the defense of the Philippines and for the islands between the Philippines and Japan. As part of the plan, the carrier-based aircraft would operate from land bases. After recovering their aircraft, TF 38 headed south that night to refuel east of Luzon the next day. In the early afternoon of 11 October, TG 38.1 and 38.4 launched an airstrike again the airfield in Aparri, on the northern coast of Luzon, which claimed to have destroyed 15 aircraft on the ground.

==== Attack on Formosa ====
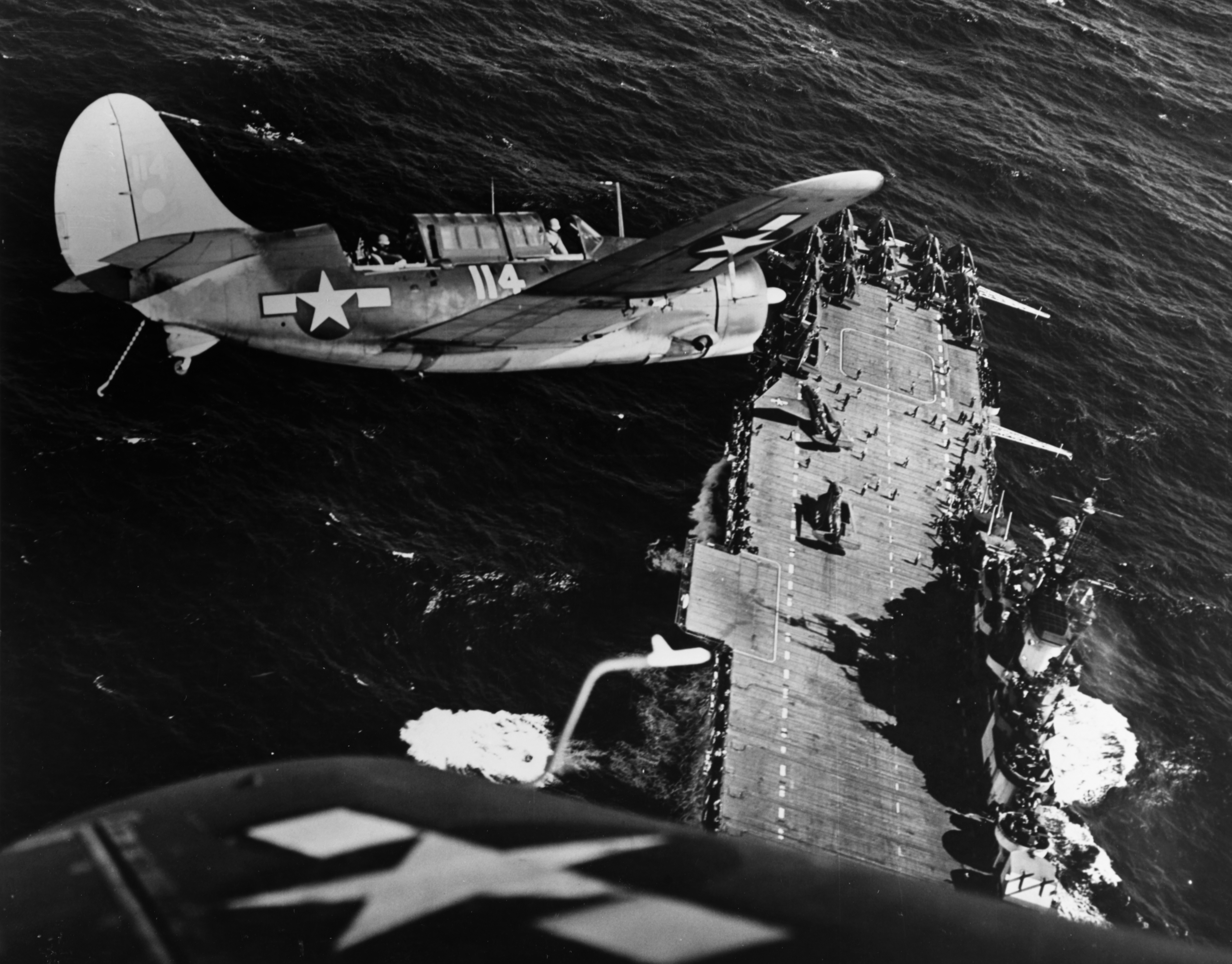
A pair of Curtiss SB2C dive bombers overflying Hornet, mid-January 1945

Before dawn, TF 38 launched a fighter sweep of 199 Hellcats against an alerted defense which already had fighters in the air. Despite this, Japanese losses were very heavy while the Americans lost 48 aircraft to all causes on 12 October. Throughout the night, the Japanese made multiple attacks, losing 42 aircraft to no effect. Another series of airstrikes followed on 13 October, although fewer defending aircraft made an appearance and TF 38's carriers lost 12 aircraft to all causes. At twilight, torpedo bombers attacked TG 38.1; Hornet evaded one torpedo that eventually crippled the heavy cruiser Canberra. Halsey had originally planned to withdraw that night to refuel on the 14th, but he had plenty of fuel left and decided to attack the airfields from which the Japanese might mount attacks on Canberra as she was towed westwards. Little opposition was encountered when the naval aviators flew their morning airstrike over Formosa and the carriers began to withdraw that afternoon, having lost 23 aircraft to all causes. TG 38.1 remained behind to protect the ships escorting Canberra. The Japanese repeated their twilight attacks against TG 38.1 and managed to cripple the light cruiser Houston with a torpedo, but both cruisers reached Ulithi about a week later. Admitted Japanese losses during the airstrikes and on the attacks on the fleet amounted to 492 aircraft, including 100 from the IJAAF.

On 18 October TG 38.1 rendezvoused with TG 38.4 off the eastern coast of Luzon. Later that morning TG 38.1's aircraft attacked targets near Clark Air Base and San Bernardino Strait, losing seven aircraft to all causes. Pilots claimed to have shot down 30 aircraft and to have destroyed 29 more on the ground. The following day, the aviators were tasked to attack airfields near Clark Air Base and Manila and claimed to have destroyed 23 aircraft on the ground. After recovering their aircraft, both task groups headed south to where they could support the amphibious landings on Leyte scheduled for 20 October. Halsey ordered on 19 October that the air groups aboard the Essex-class carriers be reorganized with 54 fighters, 24 Helldivers and 18 Avengers, using locally available replacement aircraft beginning on 29 October.

That morning TG 38.1 launched a fighter sweep over northern Mindanao; there was no evidence of Japanese aerial activity in the air or on the ground. One aircraft was reportedly destroyed at Del Monte Airfield and six others were damaged. Both task groups launched large airstrikes later that morning to attack the defenses of the landing beaches themselves and the area immediately behind them. Their effectiveness was inhibited by the dense foliage, heavy smoke in the air and the large number of aircraft involved over a relatively small area. Many aircraft had to wait almost two hours before receiving their targets for lack of sufficient communications channels. That evening the task groups departed the area to refuel the next morning, returning to the area by the morning of the 22nd, although the bad weather prevented most flying. That evening Halsey ordered TG 38.1 to proceed to Ulithi to prepare for the attacks on the Japanese mainland scheduled for 11 November. After receiving reports of Japanese surface ships in the Sibuyan Sea, Halsey ordered the task group to reverse course on the night of 23/24 October.

==== Battle off Samar ====
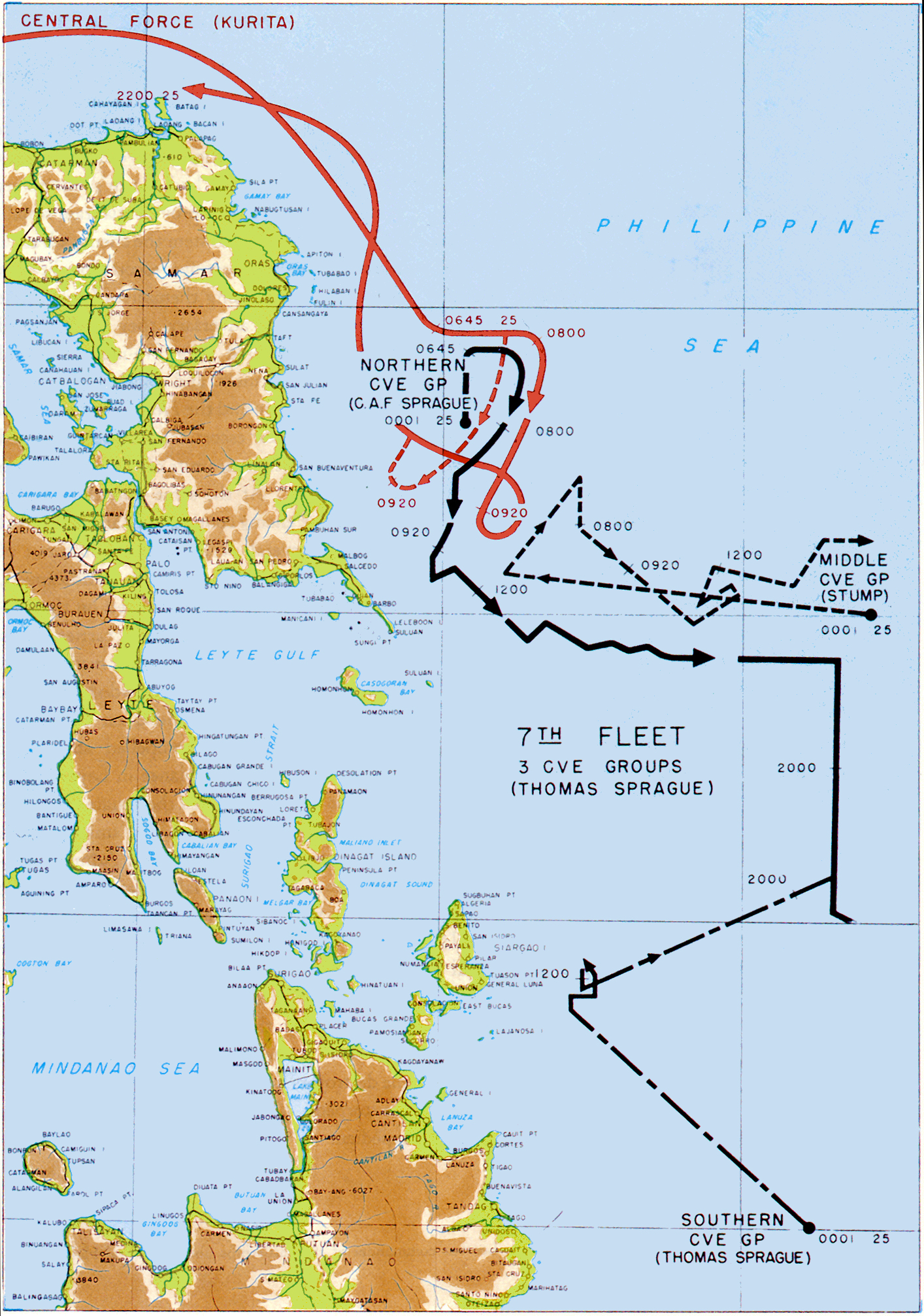
Movements during the battle

The task group was too far away to intervene when the Japanese surprised the American escort carriers off the coast of Samar on the morning of 25 October with their force of battleships and cruisers, but McCain's carriers were able to close the distance enough by the early afternoon to launch two long-range airstrikes that accomplished little. The Americans lost 14 aircraft to all causes and failed to significantly damage any of Vice Admiral Takeo Kurita's ships. The following morning, after TG 38.1 and 38.2 rendezvoused, they launched an 257-aircraft airstrike that attacked Kurita's ships. Avengers from Hornet and Cowpens hit the light cruiser Noshiro with one bomb that started a quickly extinguished fire. About 20 minutes later another Avenger put a torpedo into the cruiser; the detonation disabled all of her boilers and left her dead in the water. About an hour and a half after that, 28 of Hornet's Avengers and Helldivers hit Noshiro again with a torpedo and she sank an hour later.

Afterwards TG 38.1 resumed their interrupted voyage to Ulithi on the 27th. Four days later McCain relieved Mitscher as commander of TF 38 and Rear Admiral Alfred Montgomery assumed command of TG 38.1. The task group, together with TGs 38.2 and 38.3 returned to the Philippines in early November and attacked airfields in Luzon on 5 November, claiming to have destroyed 439 aircraft, most on the ground, while losing 36 aircraft to all causes. The aviators sank the heavy cruiser Nachi, an oiler and a cargo ship. On 11 November a troop convoy heading for Ormoc Bay was spotted; it was attacked by a large airstrike that sank five troop ships and four of the escorting destroyers despite its defending fighters for the loss of 9 US aircraft. Two days later TF 38 attacked Manila again and sank the light cruiser Kiso, four destroyers and seven merchant ships. The aviators claimed to have damaged 43 other ships and destroyed 84 aircraft while losing 25 aircraft. McCain attacked Manila again on 19 November, but with much less effect; sinking three merchantmen, damaging 13 others and claimed to have destroyed 116 aircraft, mostly on the ground, for the loss of 13 planes in combat. TGs 38.1 and 38.2 attacked targets in Luzon on the 25th, sinking the crippled heavy cruiser Kumano and a few smaller ships, and claimed to have shot down 26 Japanese aircraft and destroyed 29 on the ground. Having interdicted the flow of reinforcements to Leyte and maintained control of the air over the Philippines, the carriers retired to Ulithi to recuperate now that the Army Air Force had enough operable aircraft of its own to assume those roles. After Hornet arrived there, Clark hoisted his flag aboard her again, although he was not in command of the task group.

The increasing threat from kamikaze suicide aircraft that had damaged seven carriers since the invasion of Leyte caused the navy to reassess its air group composition. Fighters were obviously needed more to intercept the kamikazes before they could reach the fleet so the groups were reorganized to consist of 73 fighters and 15 dive and torpedo bombers each. The change would take several months to implement and a single fighter squadron that large would prove to be too big for one man to lead, so they were split into two squadrons in January 1945.

==== Battle of Mindoro ====
The temporary loss of the damaged carriers for repairs caused the reorganization of TG 38 in which Hornet was transferred to TG 38.2 for the upcoming operations in support of the assault on Mindoro scheduled for 5 December. The landings were postponed 10 days and TF 38 sortied on 11 December. The ship mustered 51 Hellcats, 15 Helldivers and 18 Avengers at this time. For this operation, the Army would cover all targets south of Manila, the escort carriers would provide direct support while the fast carriers would gain air supremacy over Luzon. Starting on the 14th, TF 38 flew continuous missions in support of that objective until they had to refuel three days later. The aviators claimed to have destroyed 269 aircraft, mostly on the ground, sunk a few merchant ships and heavily damaged roads and railroads while losing 27 aircraft in combat and 38 to accidents. The task force was unable to refuel on the 17th due to worsening weather and another attempt the next morning also failed before Halsey sailed unwittingly into the path of Typhoon Cobra later that day. Low on fuel, many ships were top-heavy and rolled heavily which sometimes broke aircraft free from their tie-down chains. Across the fleet 146 aircraft were destroyed, three light carriers were damaged when aircraft broke loose inside the hangars and three destroyers were sunk. The Third Fleet was able to refuel on 19 December, but follow-on operations over Luzon scheduled for the 21st had to be canceled when the Americans realized that the typhoon was over Luzon, so TF 38 returned to Ulithi.

==== South China Sea raid ====
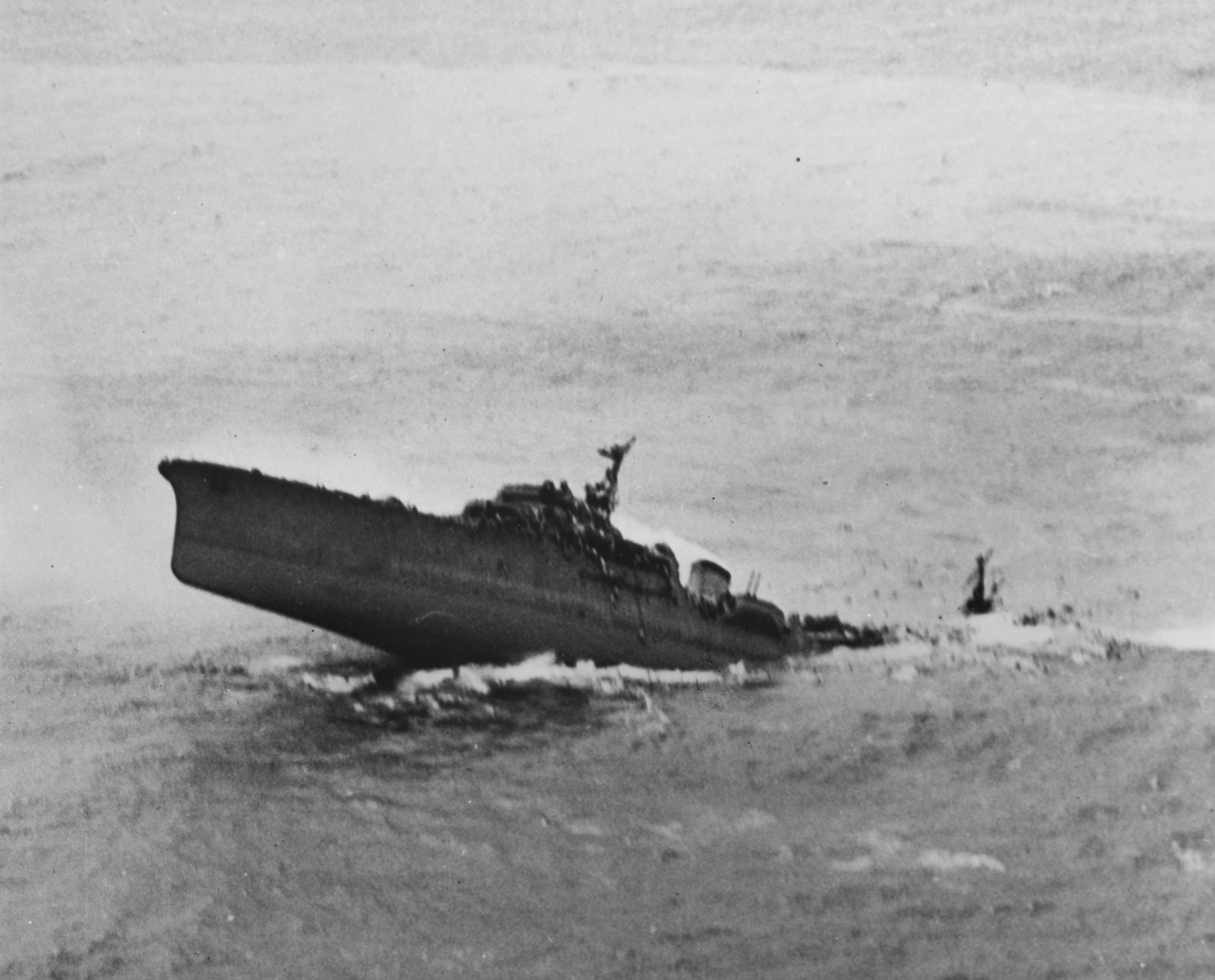
Aerial photograph of the light cruiser Kashii sinking, 12 January 1945

On 30 December, TF 38 departed Ulithi to attack Japanese airfields and shipping in Formosa, French Indo-China, Luzon, China, the Ryukyus and the Pescadores Islands in support of the scheduled landings at Lingayen Gulf in Luzon on 9 January 1945 and to interdict the maritime traffic between the Japanese home islands and her conquests in Southeast Asia. The carriers first attacked Formosa on 3–4 January before turning to Luzon for airstrikes on the 6th and 7th and then returned to bomb targets in Formosa on the 9th. While claiming to have destroyed over 150 aircraft with little aerial opposition, the Americans lost 46 aircraft in combat and 40 more in accidents. With his obligation to cover the Lingayen Gulf area until the landings were done, Halsey's ships entered the South China Sea during the night of 9–10 January in search of the two Ise-class battleships that had been partially turned into seaplane carriers and had been mistakenly reported at Cam Ranh Bay.

After refueling on the 11th, the carriers flew off almost 1,500 sorties against targets in French Indochina and off the coast. Halsey turned his ships northward and attacked Formosa and the Hong Kong area on 15–16 January and reattacked Formosa on the 21st after having exited the South China Sea. Until this date, the Third Fleet had not been attacked by the Japanese, but the kamikazes badly damaged Hornet's sister Ticonderoga. En route back to Ulithi, TF 38's planes flew reconnaissance missions over Okinawa on 22 January to aid the planned invasion of that island while also attacking Japanese positions. All told the carriers destroyed some 300,000 GRT of shipping and claimed to have destroyed 615 aircraft while losing 201 aircraft to all causes during their excursion.

=== Volcano and Ryukyu Islands campaign ===
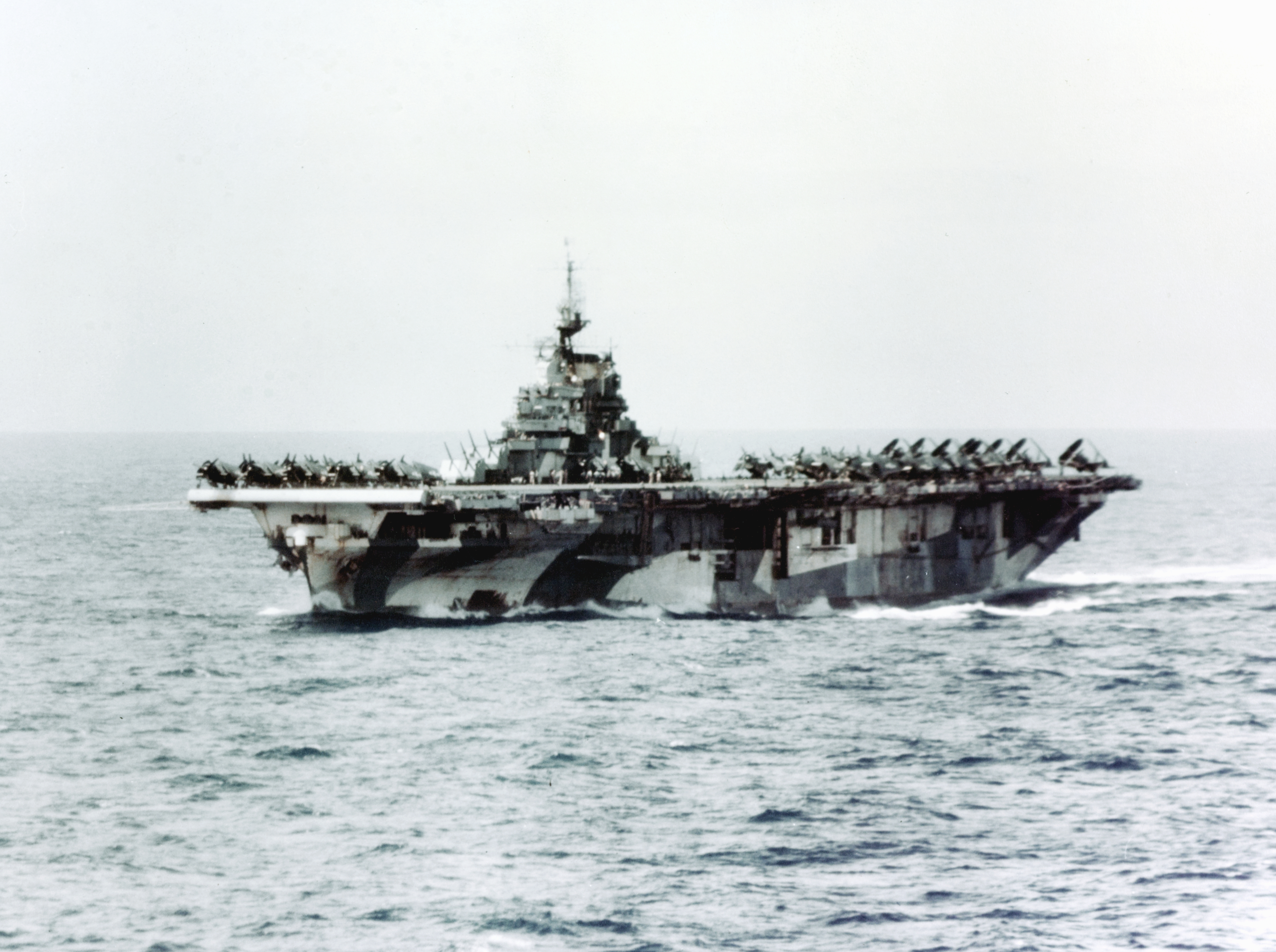
Hornet in dazzle camouflage, 27 March 1945

On 27 January, Spruance relieved Halsey, Clark assumed command of TG 58.1 and brought Hornet back to the task group. The fast carriers, now renumbered as TF 58, departed Ulithi on 10 February for full-scale aerial assaults on the Tokyo area scheduled for 16–17 February that were intended to isolate Iwo Jima. TF 58's pilots claimed to have shot down 341 aircraft and destroyed 190 on the ground; attacks on industrial targets were not very effective and little shipping was sunk, with the most notable example being the recently completed Imperial Japanese Army escort carrier Yamashio Maru. The Japanese admitted losing at least 78 aircraft in aerial combat while claiming to having shot down 134 aircraft themselves; the Americans lost 88 aircraft to all causes. The Japanese did not attack TF 58 during their time off the coast of Honshu.

The carriers turned south late in the afternoon of the 17th to prepare to support the amphibious landings on Iwo Jima on 19 February. TG 58.1 was refueling on the day of the landing, but joined the other task groups providing close support for the Marines ashore on the 20th. Three days later, Spruance released the fast carriers to attack the Japanese Home Islands again in an attempt to neutralize the kamikaze threat. Bad weather limited the effectiveness of the airstrikes around Tokyo on 25 January; continued bad weather forced the cancellation of the airstrikes planned the following day despite moving southwards overnight. Mitscher refueled his ships on the 27th and turned south to attack Okinawa on 1 March before returning to Ulithi on the 4th. American claims were 52 aircraft shot down and more than 60 destroyed on the ground in exchange for 55 aircraft lost to all causes between 19 February and 1 March.

While refitting in Ulithi, Air Group 17 relieved Air Group 11 aboard the Hornet before departing on the 14th for another series of attacks on Japan in preparation for the invasion of Okinawa. A Japanese reconnaissance aircraft spotted TF 58 on 17 March which allowed the Japanese to disperse their aircraft and hide them. American attacks on the airfields in Kyushu were largely ineffective and were fiercely opposed. Hornet's Fighter Squadron 17 encountered many fighters over Kanoya Air Field and claimed to have shot down 25 of them. Japanese attacks on TF 58 lightly damaged three carriers, none of which were under Clark's command. American fighter pilots claimed 126 aircraft shot down and the Japanese admitted losing 110 aircraft, including 32 kamikazes.

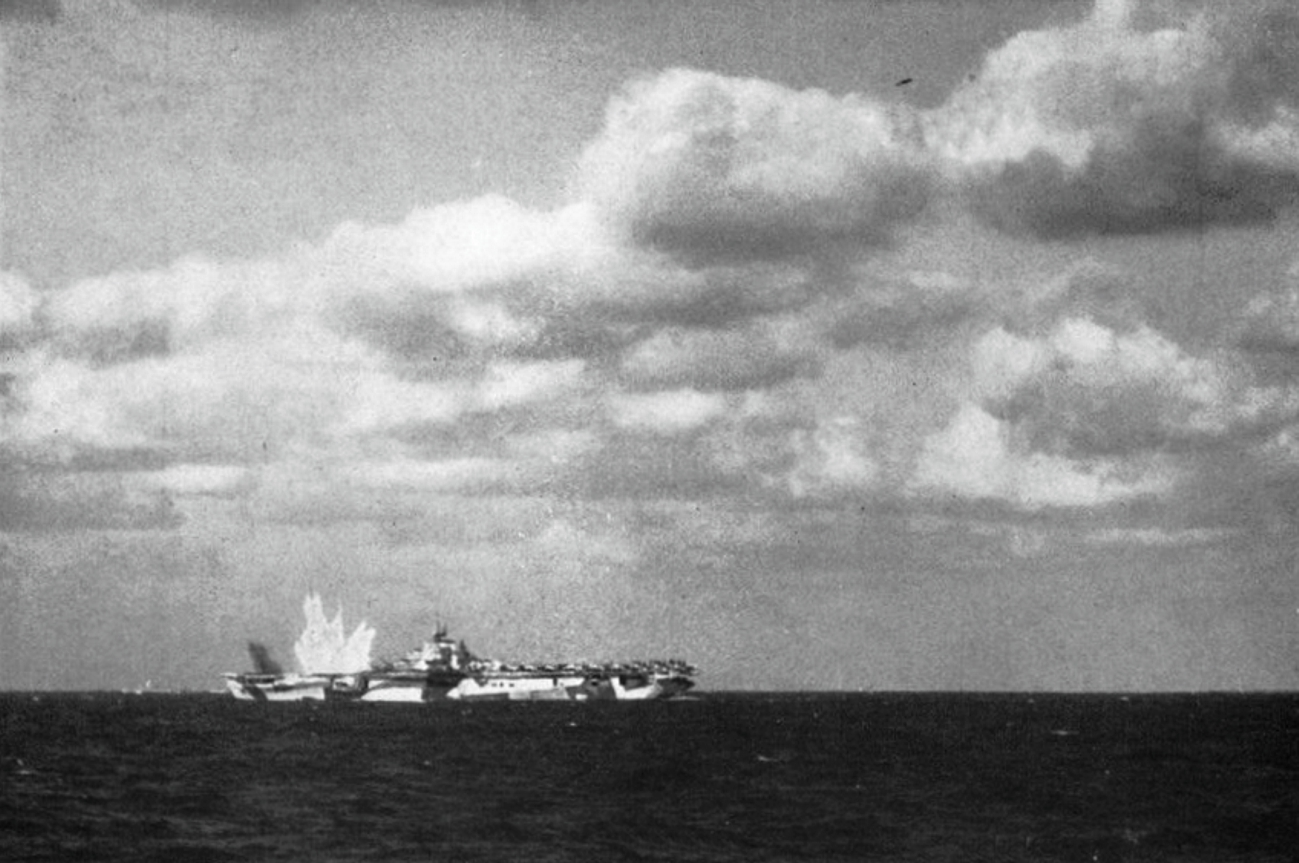
A bomb near-misses Hornet, 19 March 1945

Reconnaissance aircraft had located the remnants of the IJN in Kure and Kobe on the 18th and Mitscher ordered TGs 58.1, 58.3 and 58.4 to attack the former port. The Japanese caught Clark's carriers with their decks full of aircraft, preparing to fly off the morning's airstrike, but all of the attack aircraft were shot down; one kamikaze crashed a thousand yards (910 meters) astern of Hornet and two other were splashed by her sister Bennington's gunners. After the airstrikes flew off, further Japanese attacks crippled her sister Franklin. As they approached Kure, the 20 Hellcats of Hornet's Fighter-Bomber Squadron 17 encountered 40 fighters from the IJAAF's elite 434rd Kokutai. In a battle which lasted 25 minutes, six American and four Japanese fighters were shot down. The total casualties from the day's fighting over Japan, including the engagement between VBF-17 and the 434rd Kokutai, was 14 American and 25 Japanese aircraft shot down. The attacks on the warships in Kure were fairly ineffectual, with the American pilots lightly damaging four battleships and many other warships, but badly damaging only a single escort carrier and a light cruiser. Hornet lost 13 aircraft in combat during the day. The afternoon's scheduled airstrikes were canceled to allow TF 58 to protect its damaged ships as they withdrew; further attacks on 20 and 21 March failed to significantly damage any more ships.

TF 58 aircraft began hitting Okinawa on 23 March. The following day, TG 581.1 reconnaissance aircraft spotted a convoy that consisted of two troop transports, an ammunition ship and five escorts off Amami Ōshima headed for Okinawa; an 112-aircraft airstrike from Clark's carriers sank them all. Mitscher's carriers continued to attack Okinawa, ultimately flying a total of 3,095 sorties in the last seven days of March. The Japanese heavily attacked TF 58 between 26 and 31 March and damaged 10 ships, at the cost of around 1,100 aircraft. On 1 April, Hornet's planes began to provide direct support to the forces landing on Okinawa. Five days later the Japanese launched a mass airstrike on 6 April that consisted to almost 700 planes, of which at least 355 were kamikazes. Mitscher cleared his flight decks of all non fighters and his pilots claimed to have shot down a total of 249 aircraft. Despite this, three destroyers, two ammunition ships, and one Landing Ship, Tank were sunk by kamikazes and eight destroyers, a destroyer escort and a minelayer were damaged. The following day, the Japanese continued to attack, albeit with fewer aircraft. Kamikazes damaged Hornet's sister Hancock, one battleship, a destroyer and a destroyer escort.

==== Operation Ten-Go ====
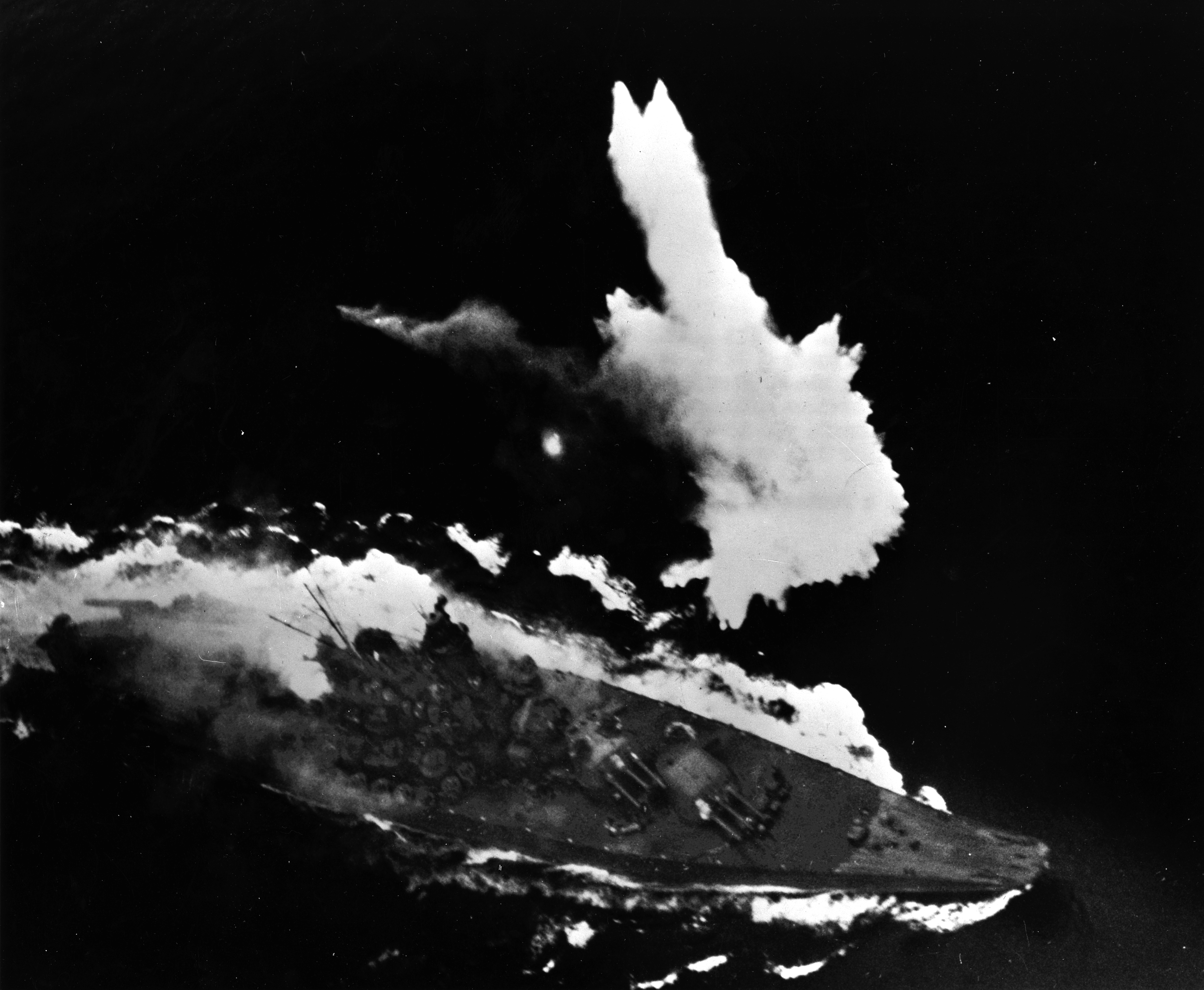
The battleship Yamato under attack. A large fire burns aft of her superstructure and she is low in the water from torpedo damage.

Operation Ten-Go (Ten-gō sakusen) was the attempted attack by a strike force of 10 Japanese surface vessels, led by the large battleship Yamato. This small task force had been ordered to fight through enemy naval forces, then beach Yamato and fight from shore, using her guns as coastal artillery and her crew as naval infantry. The Ten-Go force was spotted by American submarines shortly after it put to sea on 6 April. Reconnaissance aircraft from TF 58 found the force the following morning and TG 58.1 began launching aircraft almost two hours later. Hornet's Avengers put at least one torpedo into the battleship, the first of the ten torpedoes and five bomb hits that sank her less than two hours later. Of Yamato's screening force, the light cruiser Yahagi and four of the seven destroyers were also sunk or scuttled. The Americans lost three fighters, four dive bombers and three torpedo bombers to all causes during the attack.

On 8 April, TF 58 returned to its previous mission of providing support to the US forces ashore, although continued kamikaze attacks exacted a toll. A week later, Mitscher ordered a fighter sweep over Kyushu to focus Japanese attention on his ships rather the more vulnerable amphibious shipping sustaining the ongoing battle. His pilots claimed to have shot down 29 aircraft and destroyed 51 on the ground. His strategy worked and the kamikazes attacked TF 58 on 17 April, badly damaging Intrepid despite Clark's pilots claiming 72 attackers. The fast carriers returned to Okinawan waters and none of them were damaged by a kamikaze until 11 May. When the weather worsened in late April, Mitscher sent TG 58.1 to Ulithi to refit and rest his exhausted crews on the 27th. After Clark's ships rejoined him on 12 May, Mitscher sent TG 58.1 and 58.3 the next day to attack airfields in Kyushu and Shikoku. Over 13–14 May, their pilots claimed to have shot down 72 aircraft and destroyed 73 on the ground while losing 14 aircraft. The Japanese evened the score when they badly damaged Enterprise on the 14th.

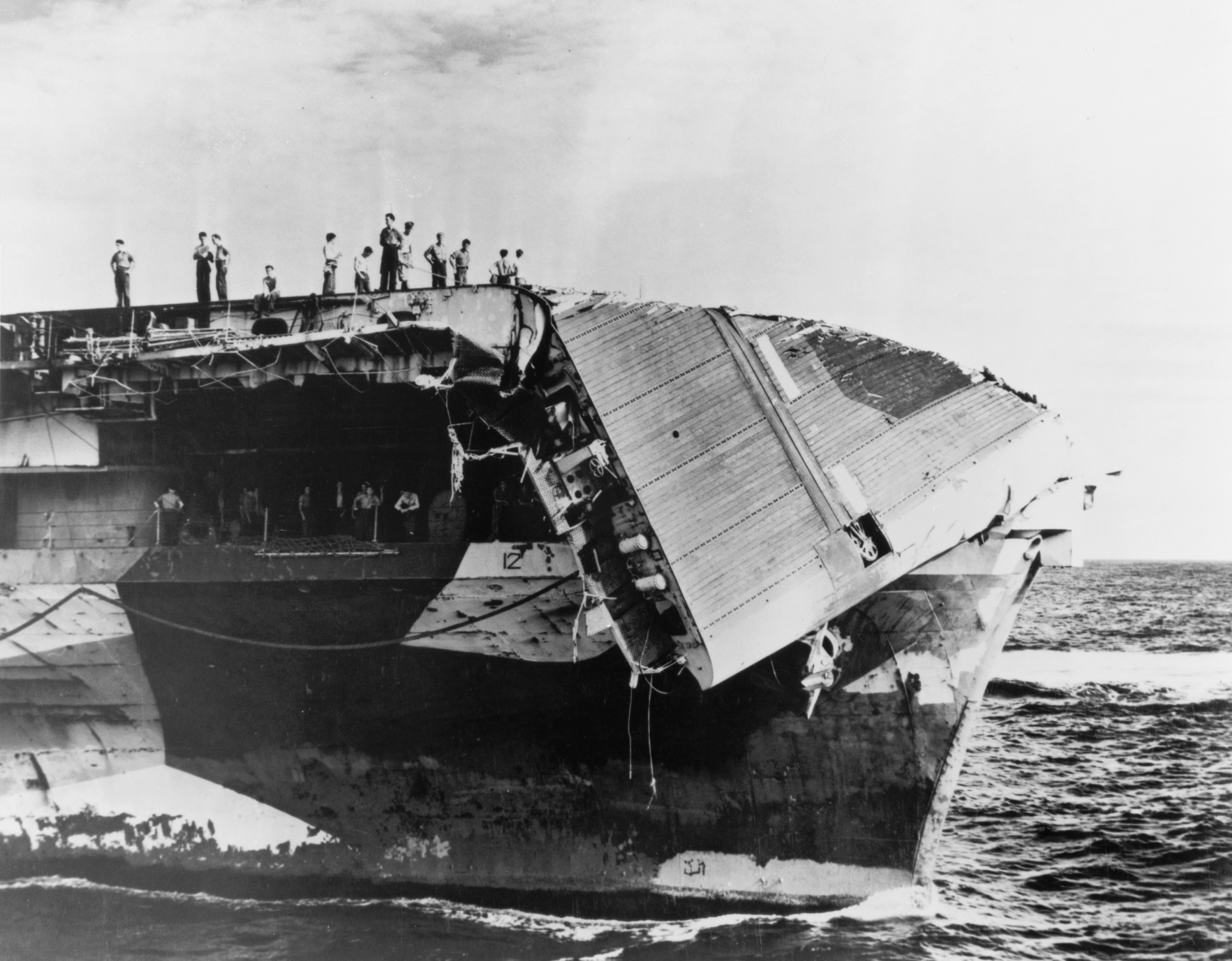
Damage from Typhoon Connie, 5 June

Halsey and McCain reassumed command and the task force resumed its former designation as TF 38 on 27–28 May, after the pace of aerial combat had slowed down. Bad weather forced the cancellation of air support over Okinawa on 30 May and on 1–3 June. Clark was able to refuel on the following day, despite worsening weather. He took his ships eastwards, hoping to avoid the developing typhoon to his southwest. Halsey, however, ordered him to steer northwestwards shortly after midnight on the 5th to position his ships for the planned airstrikes on Kyushu, which put TG 38.1 right into the path of the typhoon. Despite multiple requests to alter course to avoid the eye of the typhoon, the task group entered the eyewall region, where the most violent weather in a typhoon is located, around dawn when Clark was finally granted the freedom to maneuver. Shortly afterwards a massive wave crashed down on Hornet's bow which collapsed some 25 feet (7.6 meters) of her forward flight deck. Not long afterwards the same thing happened to Bennington and the bow was ripped off the heavy cruiser Pittsburgh. Only six men were killed during the storm, but 76 airplanes were destroyed or lost overboard and 70 were damaged. Both Hornet and Bennington were unable to launch their aircraft over the bow, which was unfortunately confirmed when a US Navy Vought F4U Corsair from VBF-85 attempted to fly off Hornet, but almost immediately flipped over and spun into the sea upon takeoff.

Clark ordered that the damaged sisters steam backwards at 18 knots (33 km/h; 21 mph) and launch their aircraft over the stern on 7 June as they provided the CAP over the task group. He detached Bennington for repairs the next day while Hornet's aircraft participated in the attack on Kanoya Air Field. On 9 April, McCain had Clark's aircraft demonstrate the effectiveness of napalm bombs on the coastal defenses of Okidaitōjima, southeast of Okinawa. The following day, his planes spotted for three battleships as they bombarded Minamidaitōjima. After arriving in Leyte on 13 June, Clark relinquished command of the task group and Hornet was ordered home for repairs, arriving in San Francisco on 7 July. Hornet earned seven battle stars and the Presidential Unit Citation for her service in the war.

Her repairs and refit were complete by 13 September, after which she was assigned to Operation Magic Carpet that had her ferry troops home from the Marianas and Hawaiian Islands, returning to San Francisco on 9 February 1946. Hornet was decommissioned on 15 January 1947 and assigned to the Pacific Reserve Fleet.

=== Peacetime tensions: 1951 to 1959 ===
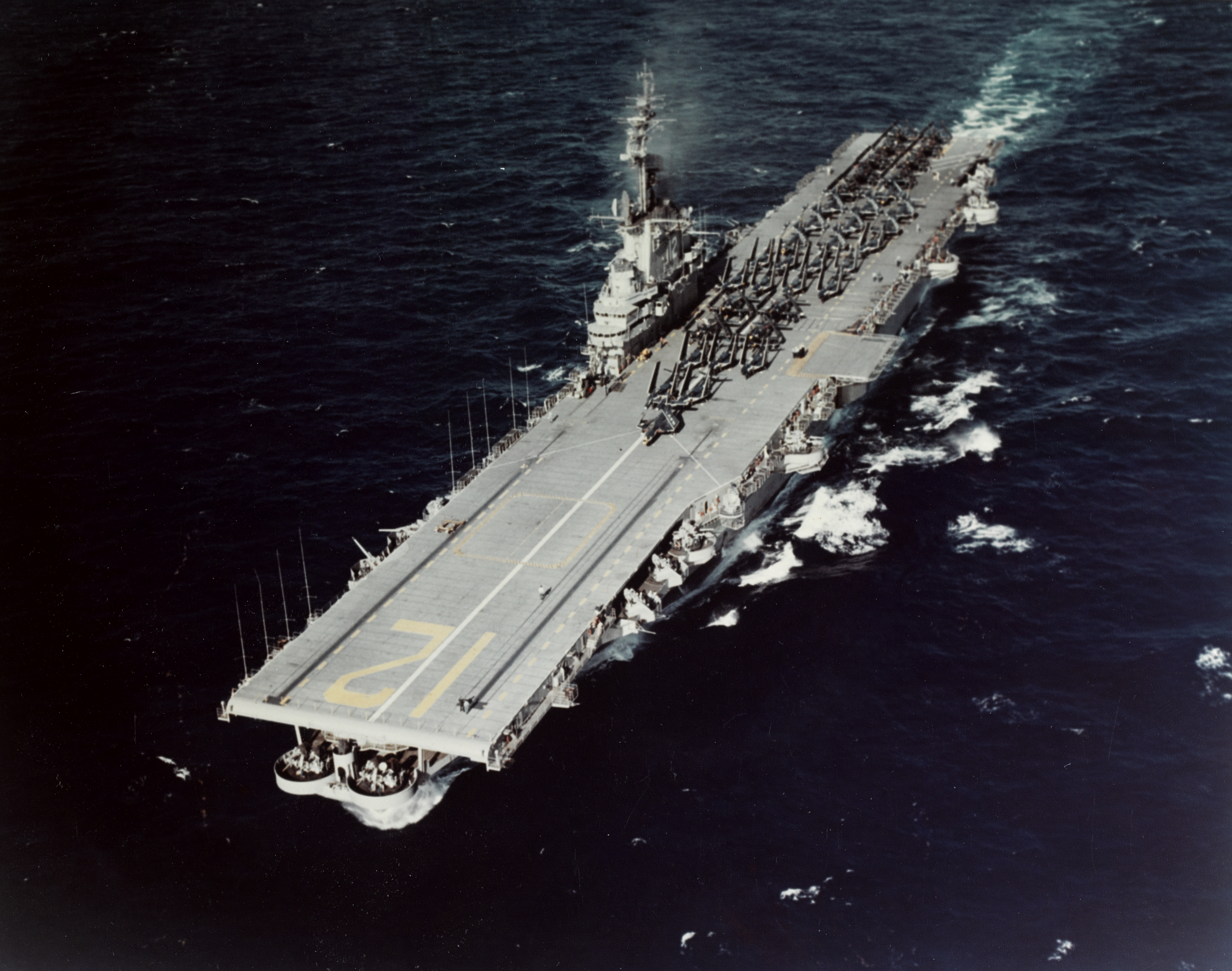
Hornet following her SCB-27A conversion

"Hornet was recommissioned on 20 March 1951, then sailed from San Francisco for the New York Naval Shipyard, where she was decommissioned on 12 May for conversion to an attack aircraft carrier CVA-12, under the SCB-27A upgrade program." Her sister Wasp badly damaged her bow in a collision on 26 April 1952; Hornet's bow was cut away and used to repair Wasp. "On 11 September 1953, she was recommissioned as an attack carrier. The ship then trained in the Caribbean Sea before departure from Norfolk on 11 May 1954 on an eight-month global cruise."

"After operations in the Mediterranean Sea and the Indian Ocean, Hornet joined the mobile 7th Fleet in the South China Sea to search for survivors of a Cathay Pacific Airways passenger plane, shot down by Chinese aircraft near Hainan Island. On 25 July, Hornet aircraft supported planes from Philippine Sea as they shot down two attacking Chinese fighters. After tensions eased, she returned to San Francisco on 12 December, trained out of San Diego, then sailed on 4 May 1955 to join the 7th Fleet in the Far East. Hornet helped to cover the evacuation of Vietnamese from the Communist-controlled north to South Vietnam, then ranged from Japan to Formosa, Okinawa, and the Philippines in readiness training with the 7th Fleet. She returned to San Diego on 10 December and entered the Puget Sound Naval Shipyard the following month for the SCB-125 upgrade."

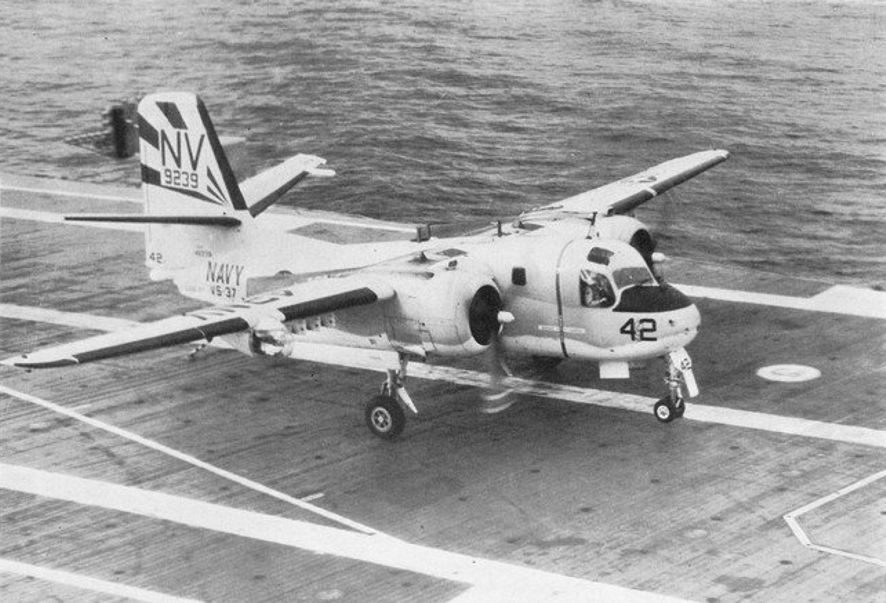
A Grumman S-2D Tracker of VS-37 aboard Hornet, circa 1963

"Following her modernization overhaul, Hornet operated along the California coast. She departed San Diego on 21 January 1957 to bolster the strength of the 7th Fleet until her return from the troubled Far East on 25 July. Following a similar cruise, 6 January – 2 July 1958," she entered Puget Sound Naval Shipyard in August, to begin the conversion into an anti-submarine warfare (ASW) carrier. "On 3 April 1959, she sailed from Long Beach to join the 7th Fleet in antisubmarine warfare tactics ranging from Japan to Okinawa and the Philippines. She returned home in October, for training along the western seaboard." In the late 1950s, an anti-submarine air group consisted of one squadron with 20 twin-engined Grumman S2F Trackers ASW aircraft, a squadron of HSS-1 Seabat ASW helicopters and a detachment of Douglas AD-5W Skyraider airborne early warning (AEW) aircraft. A detachment of four McDonnell F2H Banshee fighters was often assigned to protect the other aircraft. After 1960, the ASW air group generally consisted of two squadrons of ASW aircraft, each of 10 Trackers, a helicopter squadron of 16 Seabats or Sikorsky SH-3 Sea Kings and an AEW detachment with Grumman E-1 Tracers. No fighters were assigned between 1960 and 1965. Afterwards, the ASW carriers sometimes received a detachment of Douglas A-4 Skyhawk attack aircraft.

=== Vietnam and the Space Race: 1960 to 1970 ===
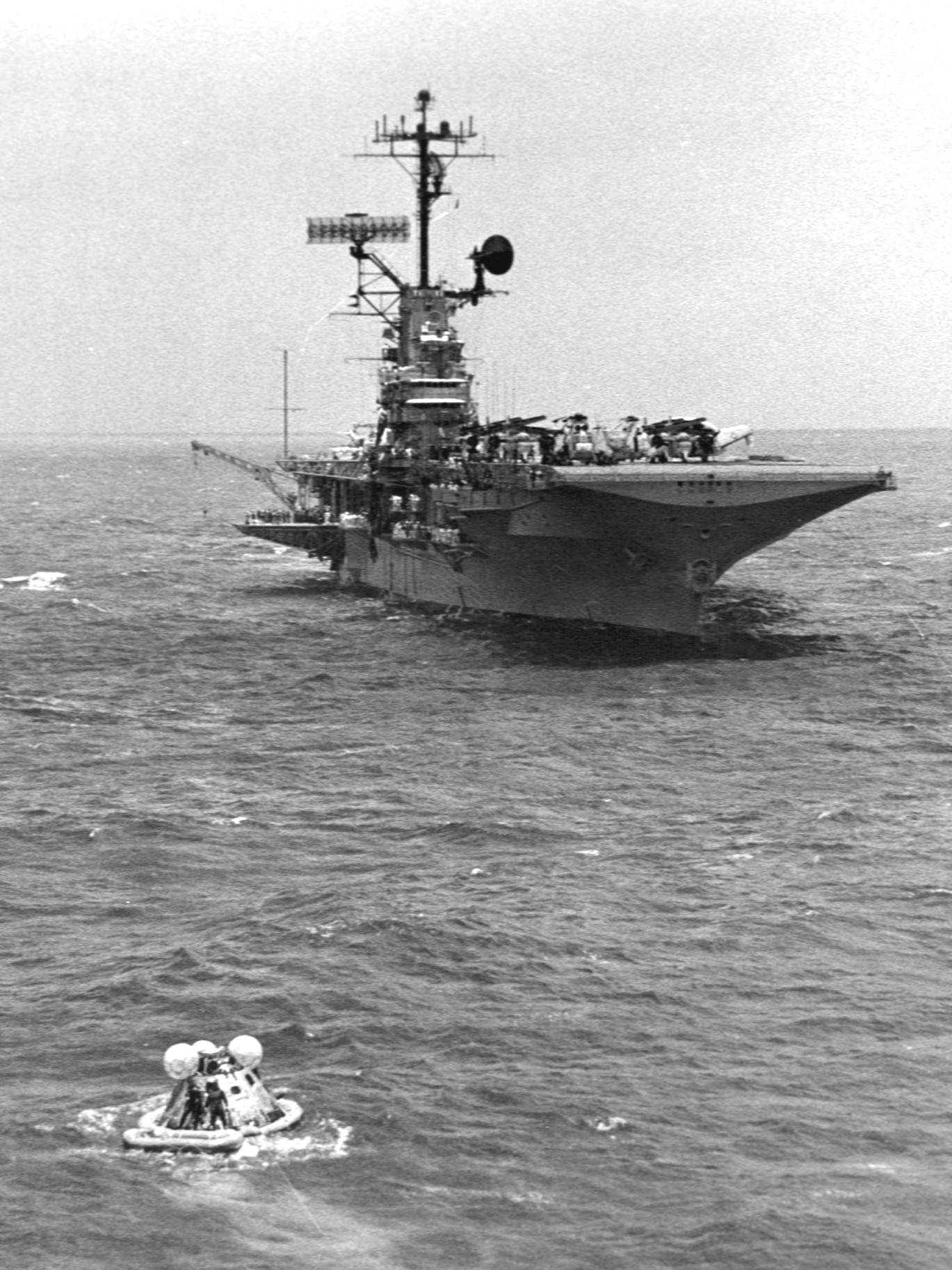
Hornet preparing to retrieve the Apollo 11 Command Module Columbia, 24 July 1969

"In the following years, Hornet was regularly deployed to the 7th Fleet for operations ranging from the coast of South Vietnam, to the shores of Japan, the Philippines and Okinawa"; she also played a key part in the Apollo program, as a recovery ship for uncrewed and crewed spaceflights. On 6 March 1965, a Sea King helicopter took off from Hornet in San Diego and flew to the aircraft carrier Franklin D. Roosevelt, off Naval Station Mayport, Florida, without refueling or landing. It covered a distance of 2,106 miles (3,389 kilometers) in 16 hours, 52 minutes, and set a Fédération Aéronautique Internationale world record for helicopters. This exceeded the previous record distance by more than 750 miles (1,210 kilometers). Hornet was deployed to Vietnam for the first time from October 1965 to January 1966, by this time all of the ASW carriers had received the SCB-144 upgrade as part of the Fleet Rehabilitation and Modernization II program. They received an AN/SQS-23 sonar mounted in the bow, as well as improved displays in the Combat Information Center. During these deployments the carriers were responsible for escorting the attack carriers in the South China Sea and providing combat search and rescue. Their Skyhawks were occasionally used to attack ground targets. On 20 September 1965, the destroyer Epperson's steering malfunctioned and collided with Hornet while refueling. Nobody was injured on either ship, but both were lightly damaged.

On 25 August 1966, she was on recovery station for the flight of AS-202, the second uncrewed flight of production Apollo Command and Service Modules. The moonship rocketed three-quarters of the way around the globe in 93 minutes before splashdown near Wake Island. Scorched from the heat of its re-entry into the Earth's atmosphere, the Apollo space capsule, designed to carry American astronauts to the Moon, was brought aboard Hornet after its test; that command module is currently on display aboard Hornet.

"Hornet returned to Long Beach on 8 September, but headed back to the Far East on 27 March 1967. She reached Japan exactly a month later and departed the Sasebo base on 19 May for the war zone." She operated in Vietnamese waters until October and returned for another deployment from November 1968 to April 1969. After the North Koreans shot down a Lockheed EC-121 Warning Star AEW aircraft on 14 April over international waters, Hornet was ordered to reinforce the American ships gathering in the area in what became a pointless show of force.

Hornet recovered the three astronauts (Neil Armstrong, Michael Collins, and Buzz Aldrin) and their command module Columbia from the first Moon landing mission, Apollo 11, after splashdown about 900 miles southwest of Hawaii in the Pacific Ocean on 24 July 1969. President Nixon was on board to welcome the returning astronauts back to Earth, where they lived in quarantine aboard Hornet prior to transfer to the Lunar Receiving Laboratory at Houston. Hornet also recovered Apollo 12 on 24 November. Returning astronauts Charles Conrad, Jr., Alan L. Bean, and Richard F. Gordon, Jr., were picked up from their splashdown point near American Samoa.

=== Retirement: 1970 to present ===
- USS Hornet Museum
- U.S. National Register of Historic Places
- U.S. National Historic Landmark
- California Historical Landmark
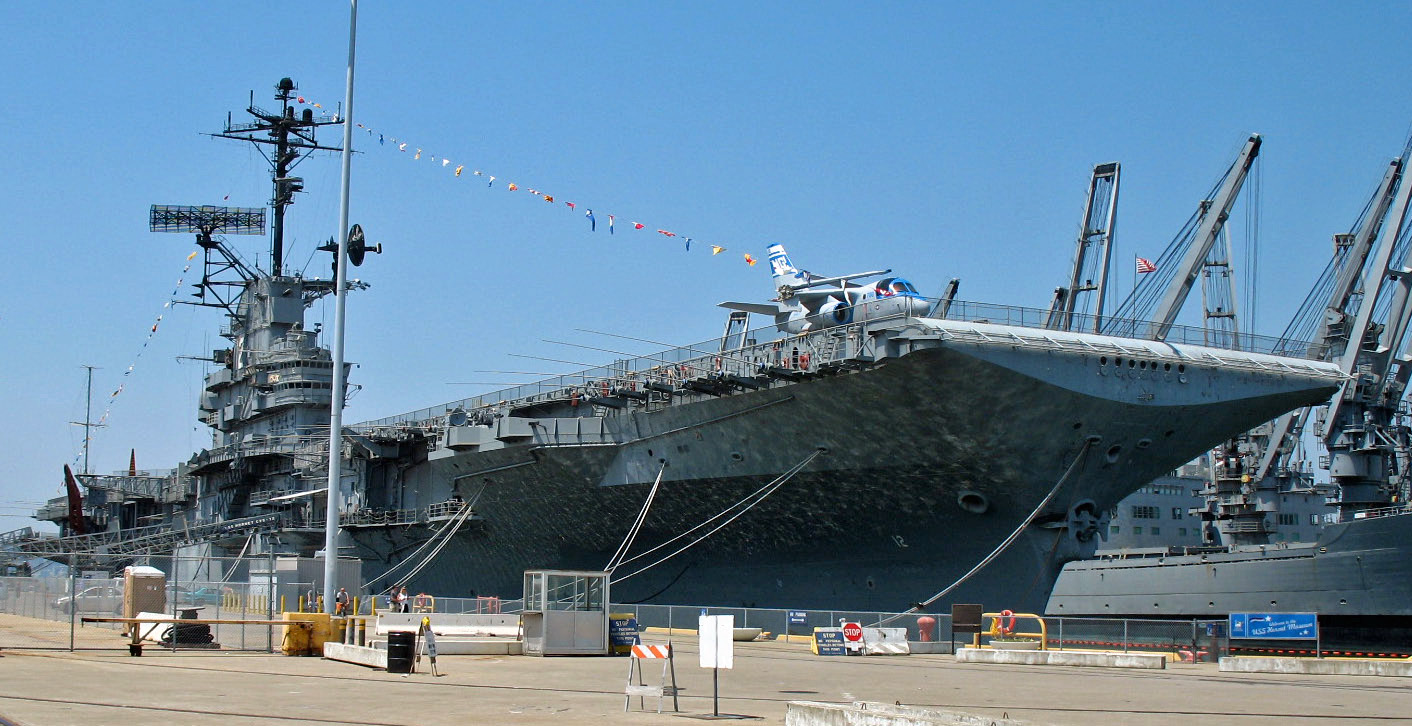
- USS Hornet docked in Alameda
- Coordinates: 37°46′21.15″N 122°18′10.23″W
- Area: Alameda
- NRHP reference No.: 91002065
- CHL No.: 1029

Significant dates
- Added to NRHP: 4 December 1991
- Designated NHL: 4 December 1991

Hornet was decommissioned 26 June 1970 and mothballed at the Puget Sound Naval Shipyard and Intermediate Maintenance Facility. She was stricken from the Naval Vessel Register on 25 July 1989. In 1991, she was designated a National Historic Landmark. The carrier was donated to the Aircraft Carrier Hornet Foundation on 26 May 1998. On 17 October 1998, she was opened to the public as USS Hornet Museum in Alameda Point, Alameda, California. She was designated a California State Historic Landmark in 1999, and is listed on the National Register of Historic places, #91002065.

Building on her status as an authentically restored aircraft carrier, Hornet has been featured in a number of film and television shows. Several TV shows have been recorded on board; and in 1997, she was the subject of an episode of the TV series JAG filmed on location, the season-three opener Ghost Ship. The thrash metal band Exodus filmed the music video for their song "War Is My Shepherd" on board the Hornets flight deck in 2004. Also in 2004, she was the set for scenes from the movie XXX: State of the Union, which starred Ice Cube, and portions of the 2007 film Rescue Dawn, which starred Christian Bale, were shot on board. Hornet was both the subject and the setting of the independent film Carrier (2006). Hornet also hosted the final task and finish line of the thirtieth season of the reality show The Amazing Race.

Hornet also hosts CarrierCon, a fan convention for anime, video game, comic and cosplay fans. In 2023, CarrierCon collaborated with Azur Lane, a mobile game that features anthropomorphic "shipgirls" including Hornet herself, as well as featuring a separate shipgirl called "Hornet Chan" as the mascot of the event. Later that year, Hornet was chosen to host Azur Lane's live event celebrating the 5th anniversary of its English/worldwide release. In 2025, the con hosted a variety of VTubers, many from VFleet Project, which provided an in-person virtual concert to attendees.

In 2024, a FIRST Robotics Competition offseason event was hosted on the Hornet's flight deck.

== "Ghost Ship" ==
Although docked as a museum piece, the Hornet has long had a reputation as a "Ghost Ship" and has been called "The Most Haunted Ship in America". The ship lost an estimated 300 sailors to accidents and suicides in its history, and had an unusually high suicide rate. The ship has been featured on multiple ghost-hunting shows, and visitors and workers have regularly reported "eerie phenomena", such as seeing apparitions, hearing footsteps and voices when no one is around, or objects moving themselves. "Ghost tours" and overnight stays are offered on the ship, and in the period before Halloween part of the ship is converted into a "haunted house" experience. At least one web site is devoted to allowing users to record their ghost stories or experiences on the Hornet. The ship's ghost reputation has been incorporated into several TV shows such as JAG (S3E1) and Hawaii Five-0 (S6E18).

== In popular culture ==
The USS Hornet was used as a model for the FCU Endurance, a fictional aircraft carrier that plays a prominent role in Bandai Namco Entertainment's 2026 video game Ace Combat 8: Wings of Theve. According to an employee at the USS Hornet Museum, in late 2024, a team from Bandai Namco Aces, the division of Bandai Namco Studios responsible for developing the Ace Combat series of games, took 3D scans of the Hornet for use in the game's development.

== Awards ==

- Presidential Unit Citation
- Meritorious Unit Commendation (3)
- China Service Medal (extended)
- American Campaign Medal
- Asiatic-Pacific Campaign Medal (7 battle stars)
- World War II Victory Medal
- Navy Occupation Service Medal (with Europe clasp)
- National Defense Service Medal (2)
- Armed Forces Expeditionary Medal (2)
- Vietnam Service Medal (6 battle stars)
- Philippine Presidential Unit Citation
- Republic of Vietnam Meritorious Unit Citation (Gallantry Cross Medal with Palm)
- Philippine Liberation Medal (1 battle star)
- Republic of Vietnam Campaign Medal

== Gallery ==
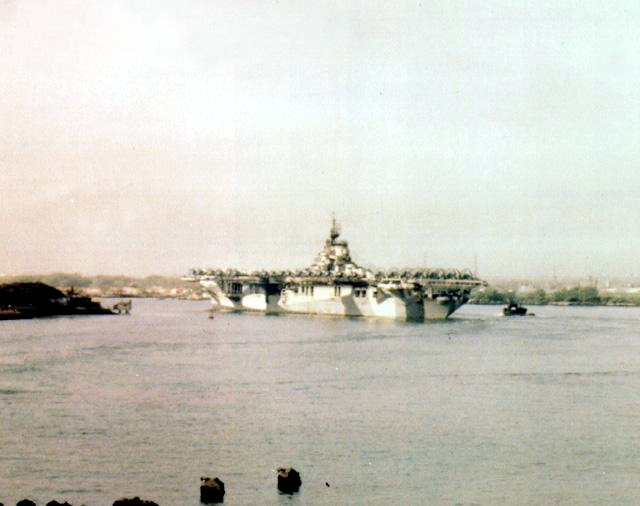
Hornet leaving Pearl Harbor in March 1944

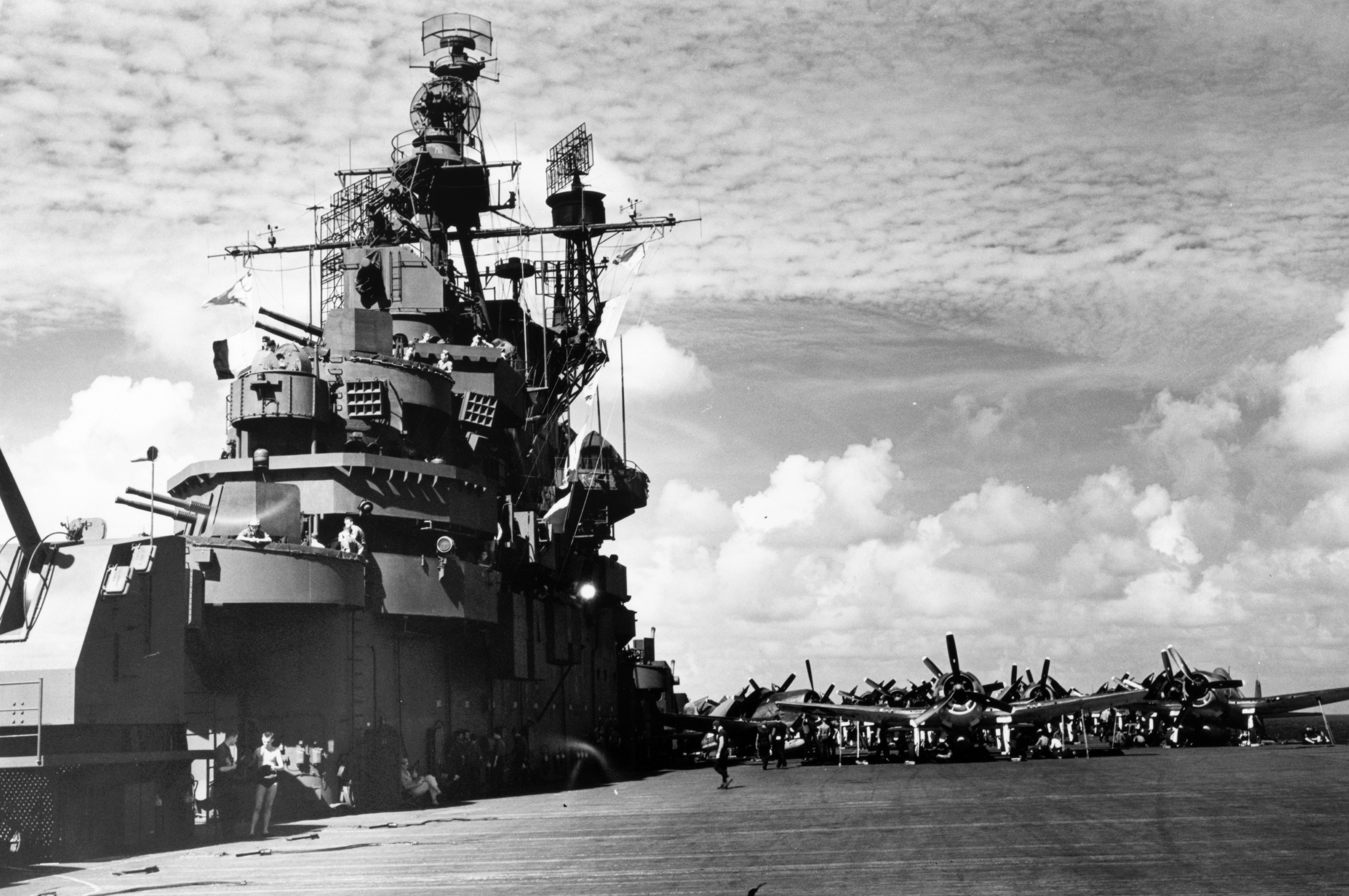
Hornet island in April 1945

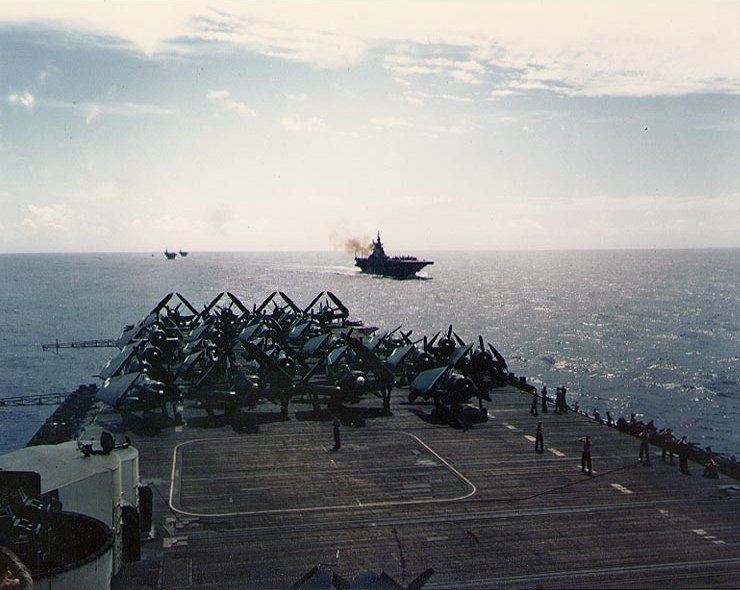
Hornet's flight deck in June 1945

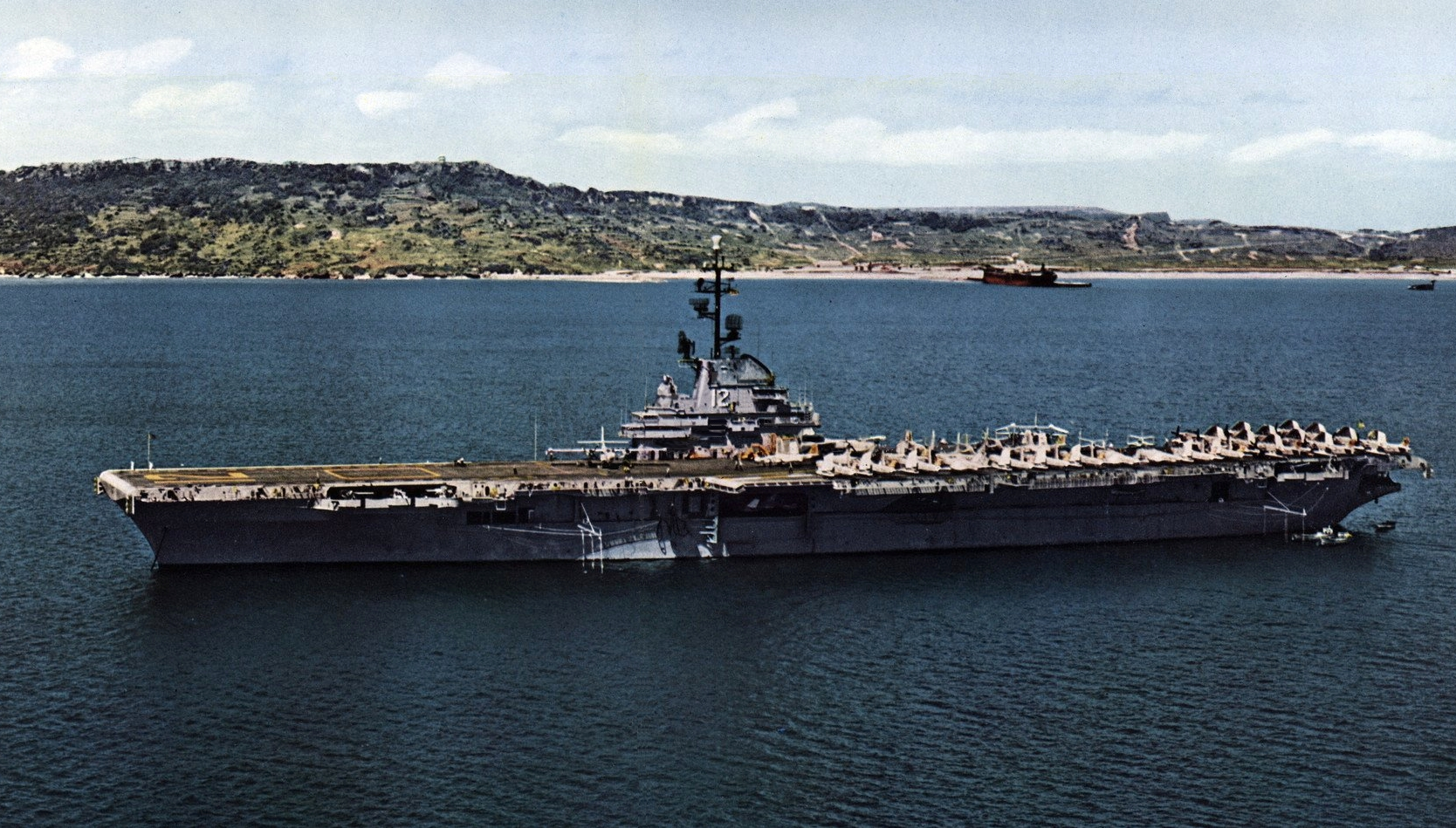
Hornet at anchor in 1958

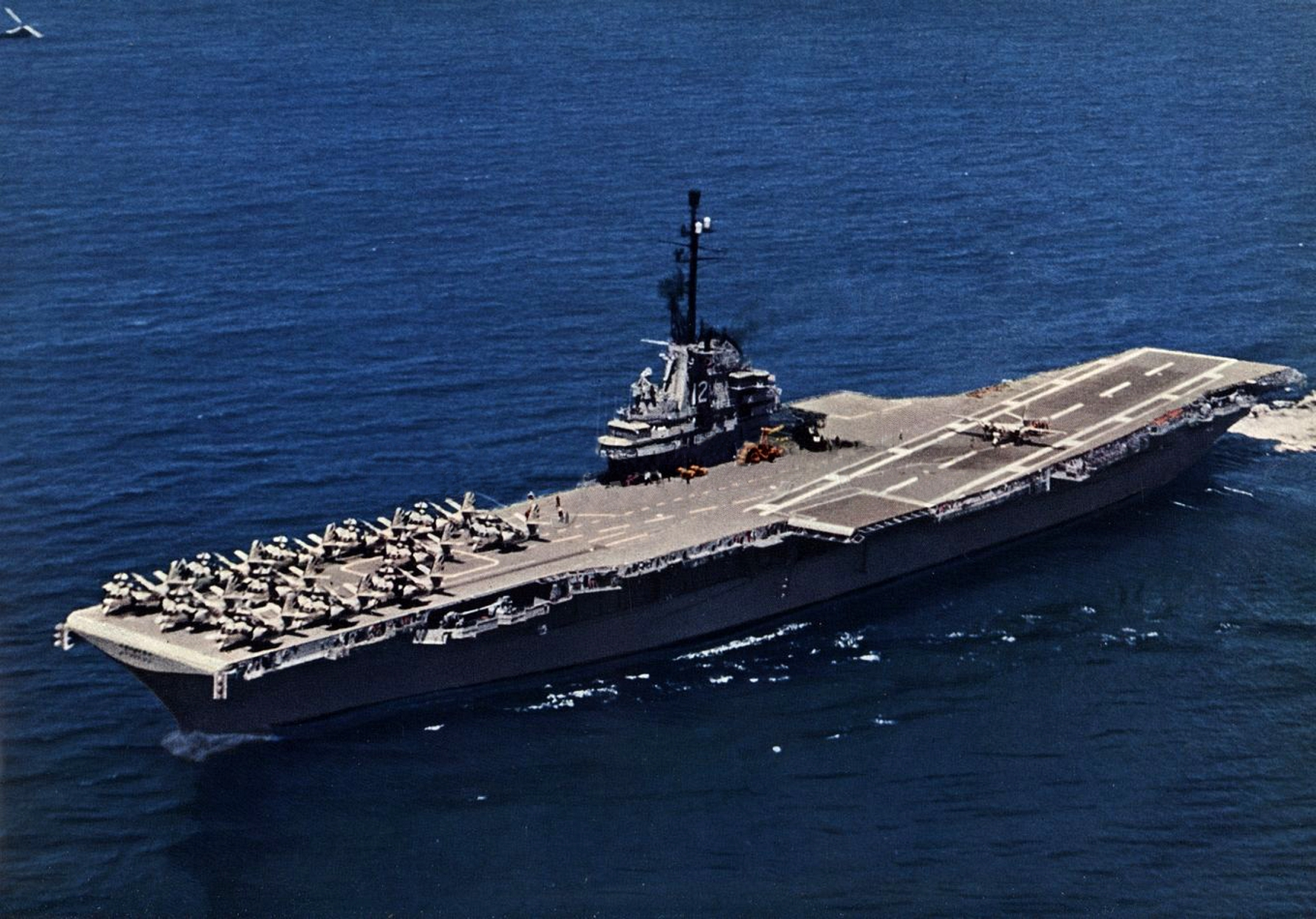
Hornet underway at sea in 1960

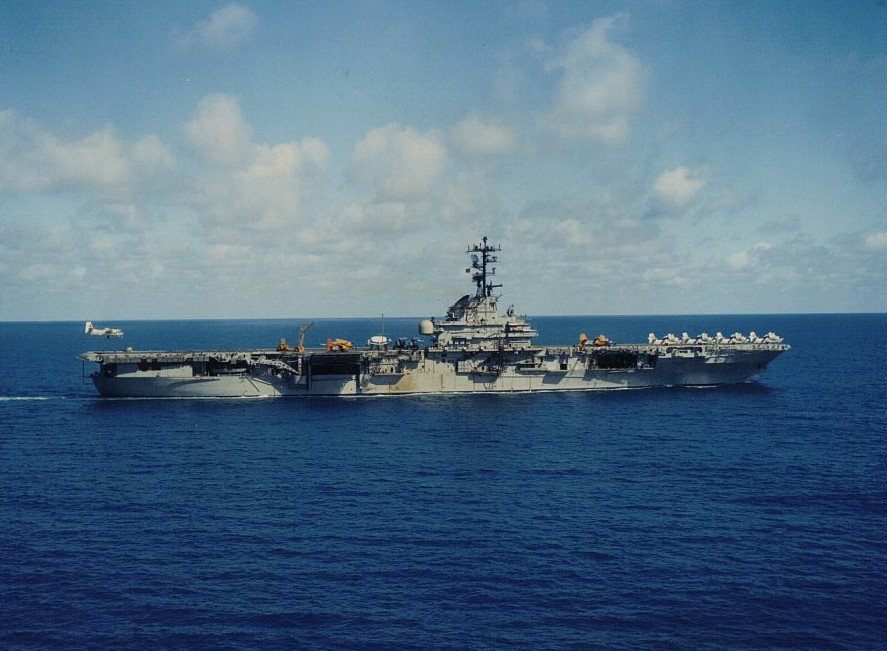
Hornet underway in the Pacific Ocean on 5 December 1968

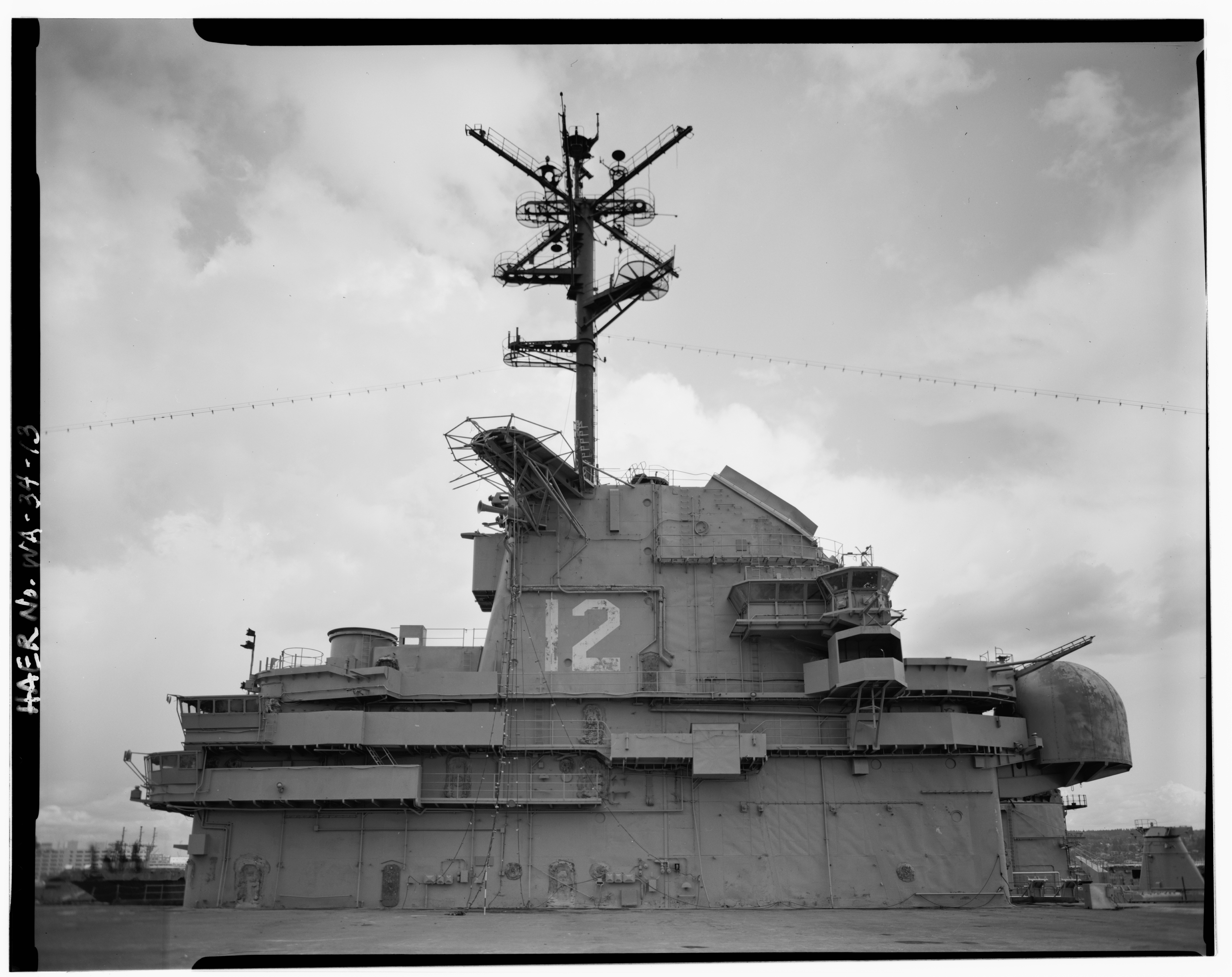
Hornet's bridge in 1992

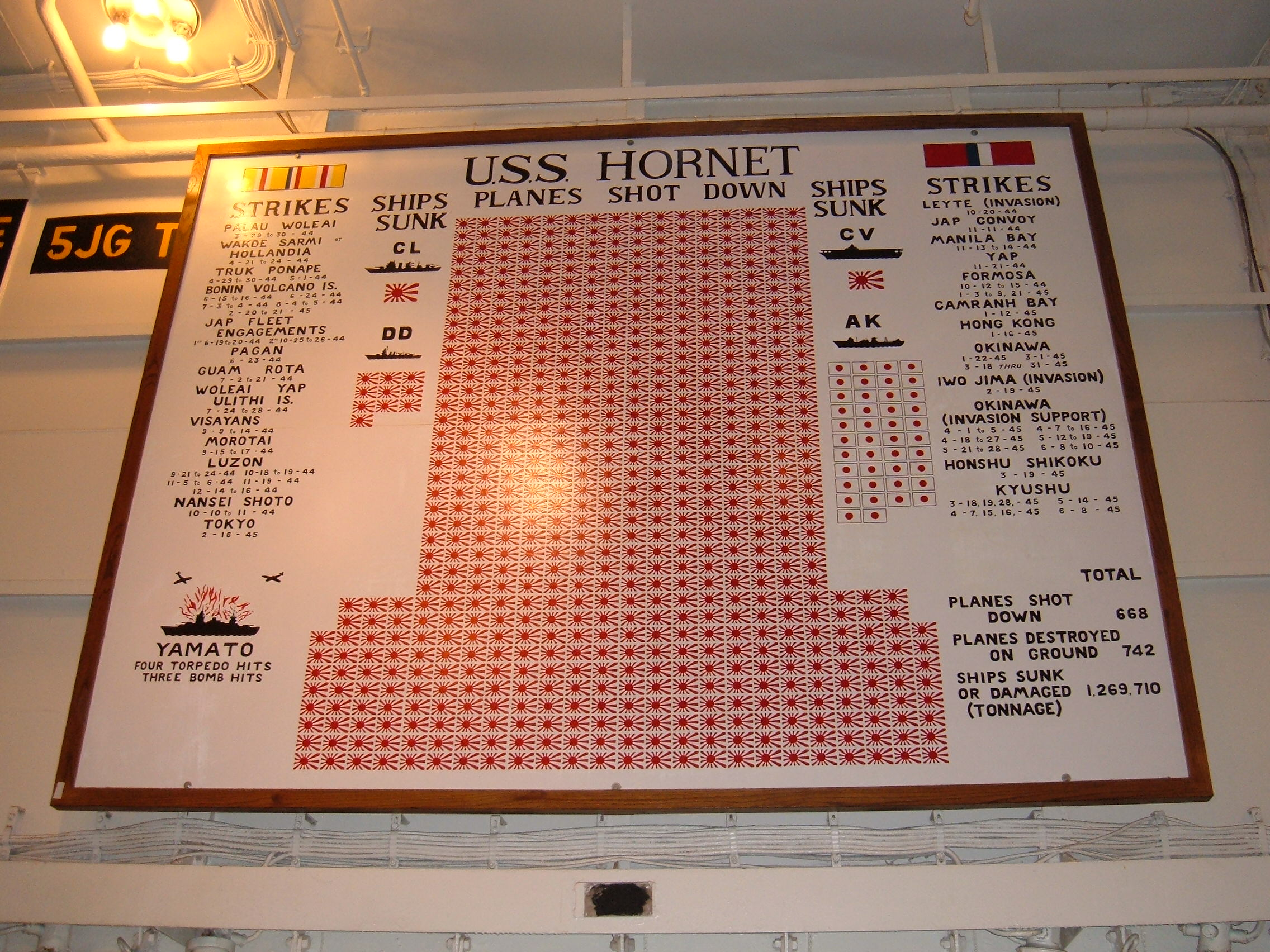
Hornet's scoreboard

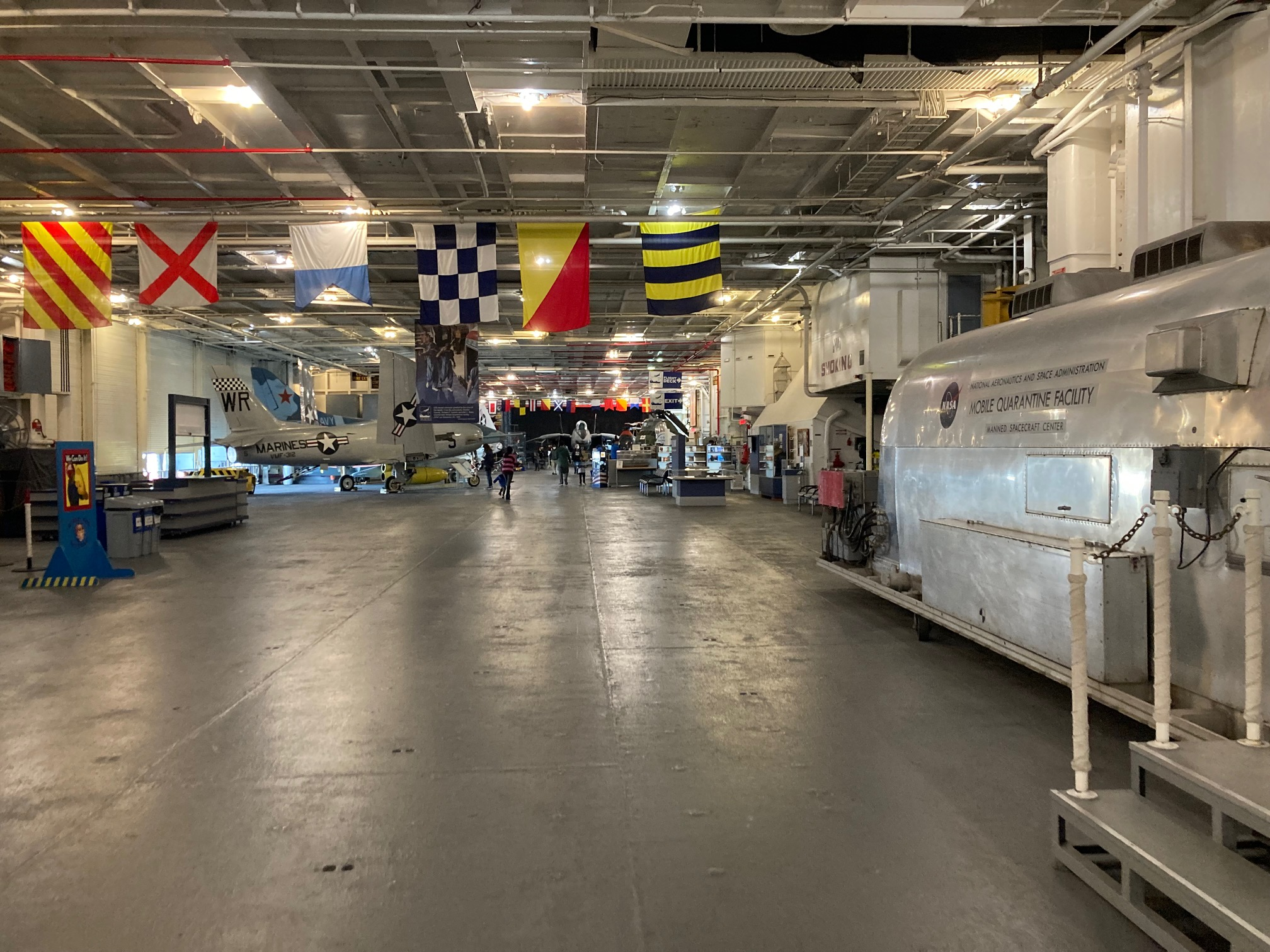
View of the forward hangar deck of the USS Hornet Museum, 2022

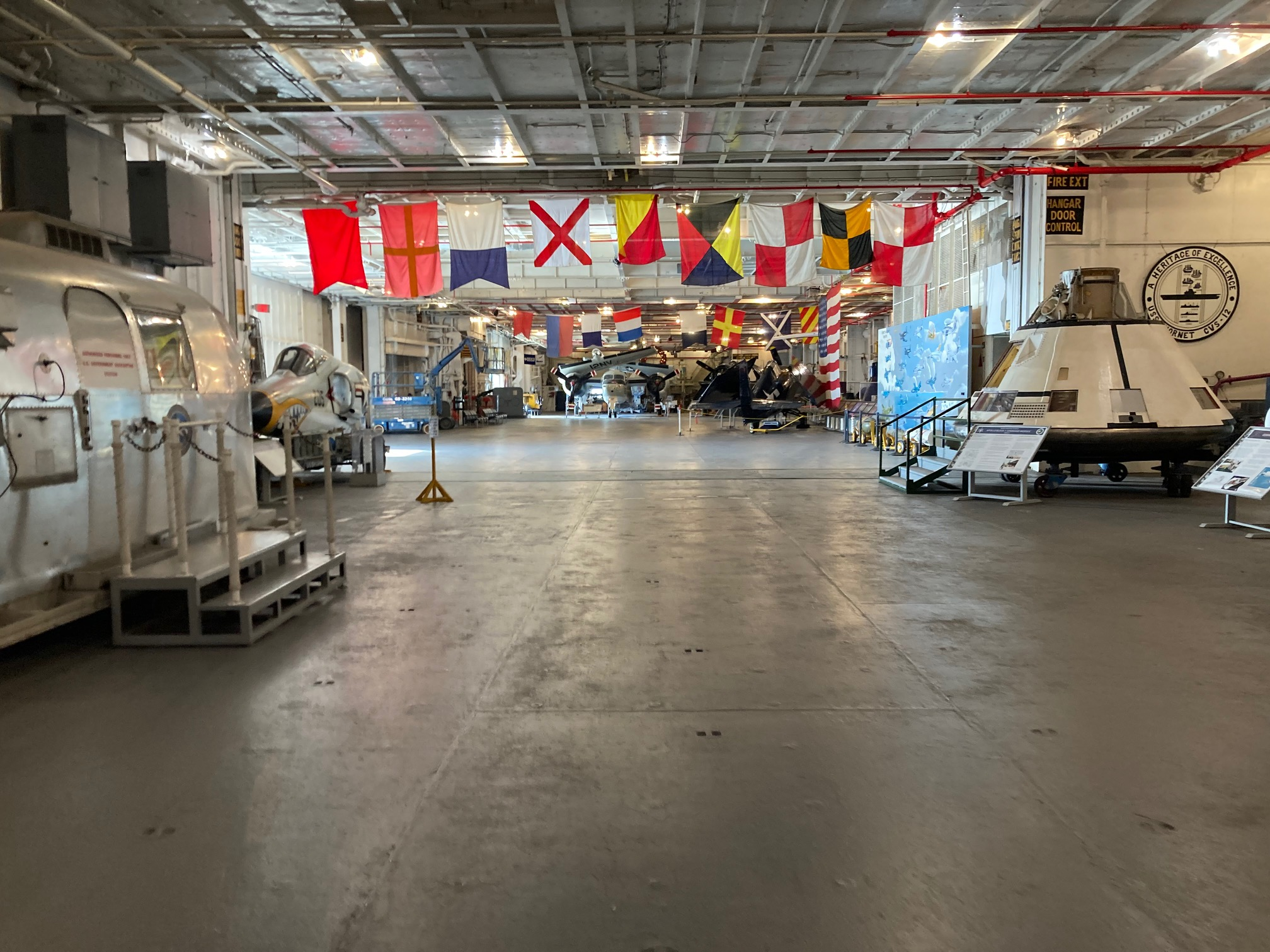
View of the aft hangar deck of the USS Hornet Museum, 2022

== See also ==
- National Register of Historic Places in Alameda County, California
- List of National Historic Landmarks in California

== Bibliography ==
- Bates, Richard (1953). The Battle for Leyte Gulf, October 1944: Strategical and Tactical Analysis, Volume I: Preliminary Operations Until 0719 October 17th, 1944, Including Battle off Formosa. n.p.: US Naval War College.
- Bates, Richard (1955). The Battle for Leyte Gulf, October 1944: Strategical and Tactical Analysis, Volume II: Operations 0719 October 17th until October 20th (D-day). n.p.: US Naval War College.
- Bates, Richard (1957). The Battle for Leyte Gulf, October 1944: Strategical and Tactical Analysis, Volume III: Operations from 0000 October 20th (D-day) until 1042 October 23rd. n.p.: US Naval War College.
- Brown, David (1977). Aircraft Carriers. World War 2 Fact Files. New York: Arco Publishing. ISBN 0-66804-164-1.
- Brown, J. D. (2009). Carrier Operations in World War II. Annapolis, Maryland: Naval Institute Press. ISBN 978-1-59114-108-2.
- Chesneau, Roger, ed. (1980). Conway's All the World's Fighting Ships 1922–1946. Greenwich: Conway Maritime Press. ISBN 0-85177-146-7.
- Faltum, Andrew (1996). The Essex Aircraft Carriers. Baltimore, Maryland: Nautical & Aviation. ISBN 1-877853-26-7.
- Friedman, Norman (1983). U.S. Aircraft Carriers: An Illustrated Design History. Annapolis, Maryland: Naval Institute Press. ISBN 0-87021-739-9.
- "Hornet VIII (CV-12)". Dictionary of American Naval Fighting Ships. Navy Department, Naval History and Heritage Command. 22 December 2004.
- Polmar, Norman & Genda, Minoru (2006). Aircraft Carriers: A History of Carrier Aviation and Its Influence on World Events. Vol. I, 1909–1945. Washington, D.C.: Potomac Books. ISBN 1-57488-663-0.
- Polmar, Norman & Genda, Minoru (2006). Aircraft Carriers: A History of Carrier Aviation and Its Influence on World Events. Vol. II, 1946–2006. Washington, D.C.: Potomac Books. ISBN 978-1-57488-665-8.
- Prados, John C. (2016). Storm Over Leyte: The Philippine Invasion and the Destruction of the Japanese Navy. Dutton Caliber. ISBN 978-0-4514-7361-5.
- Raven, Alan (1988). Essex-class Carriers. Warship Design Histories. Vol. 2. Annapolis, Maryland: Naval Institute Press. ISBN 0-87021-021-1.
- Reynolds, Clark G. (2005). On the Warpath in the Pacific: Admiral Jocko Clark and the Fast Carriers. Annapolis, Maryland: Naval Institute Press. ISBN 1-59114-716-6.
- Tillman, Barrett (1994). The Marianas Turkey Shoot, June 19–20, 1944: Carrier Battle in the Philippine Sea. St. Paul, Minnesota: Phalanx Publishing. ISBN 1-883809-04-5.
- Tillman, Barrett (2010). Whirlwind: The Air War Against Japan, 1942–1945. New York: Simon & Schuster. ISBN 978-1-4165-8440-7.
- Young, Edward M. (2012). American Aces Against the Kamikaze. Oxford: Osprey Publishing. ISBN 978-1-8490-8745-2.
