= July 1969 =

Month of 1969

<<	July 1969					>>
Su	Mo	Tu	We	Th	Fr	Sa
		1	2	3	4	5
6	7	8	9	10	11	12
13	14	15	16	17	18	19
20	21	22	23	24	25	26
27	28	29	30	31

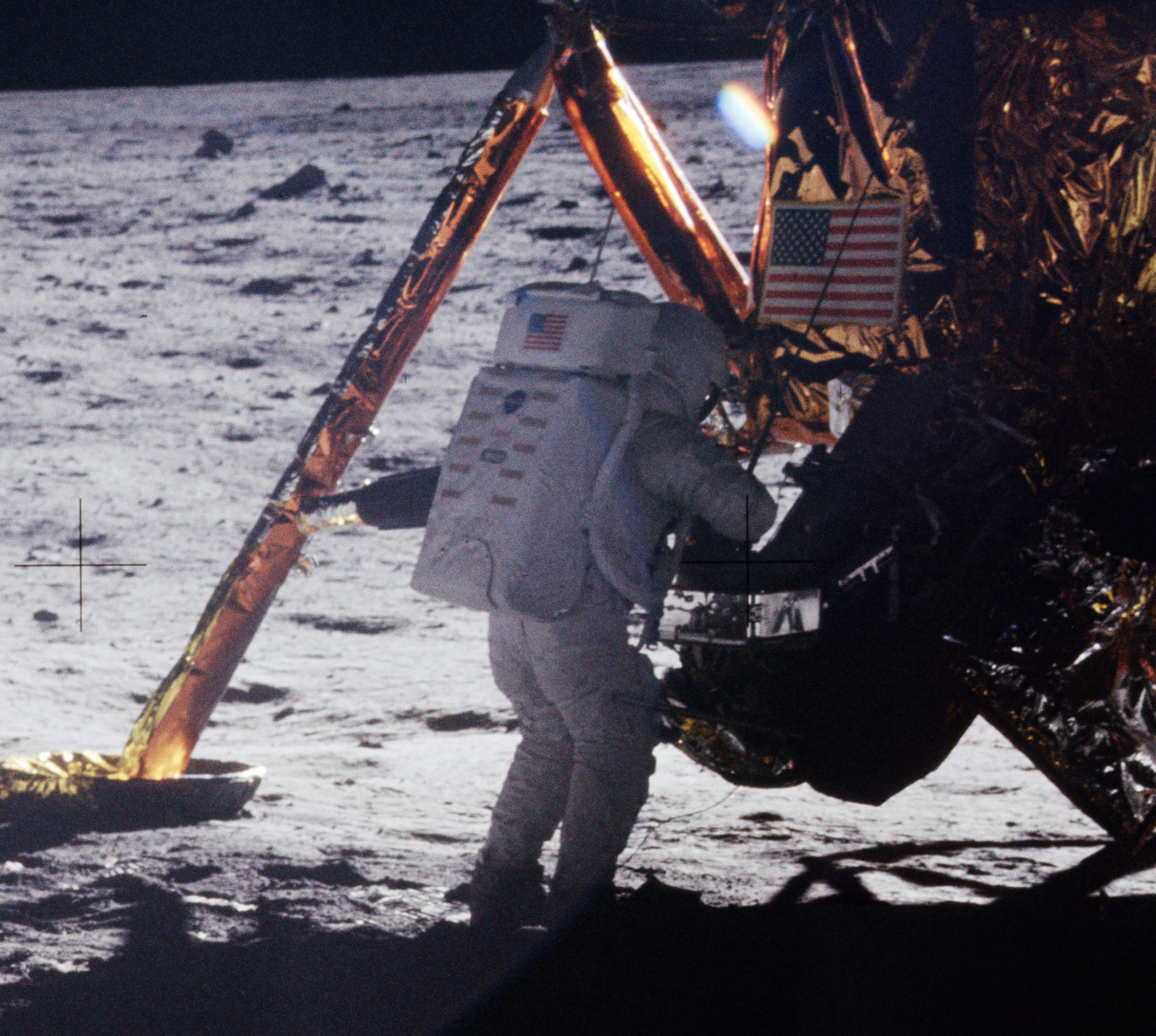
July 20, 1969: Neil Armstrong becomes first man to walk on the Moon

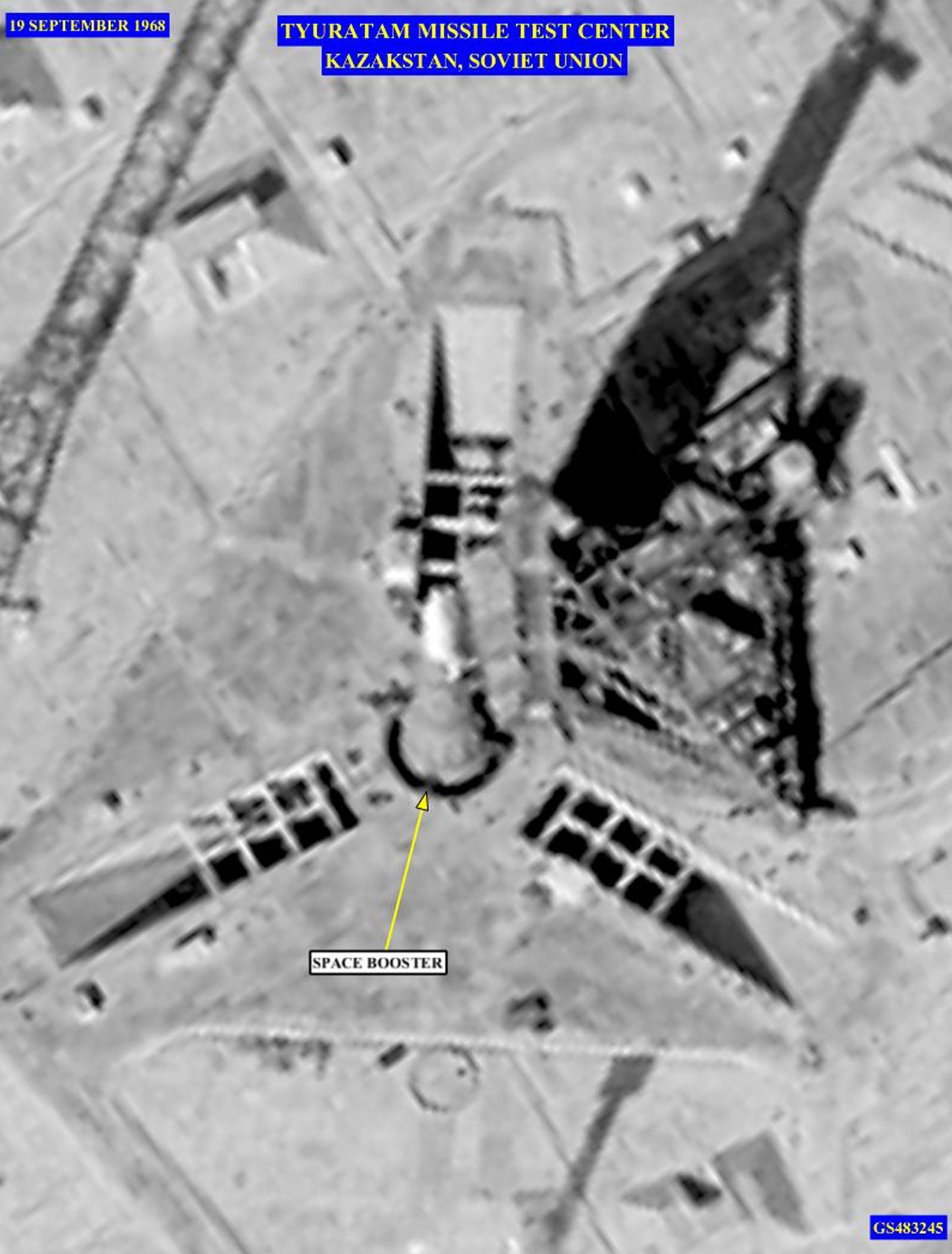
July 2, 1969: Soviet counterpart to the Saturn V, the N1 rocket (pictured 1968) fails launch attempt

July 20, 1969: Buzz Aldrin photographed walking on the Moon (note Armstrong reflected in helmet visor)

July 17, 1969: New York Times regrets its 1920 error about Robert H. Goddard

The following events occurred in July 1969:

== July 1, 1969 (Tuesday) ==
- The formal investiture of the United Kingdom's Prince Charles as the Prince of Wales took place at Caernarvon Castle in Wales, as the crown prince's mother, Queen Elizabeth II, placed the coronet (a small crown) on in his head. For the first time, the ceremony was televised live to British viewers, and was seen by an estimated half a billion viewers in the United States and in the British Commonwealth. Charles had been declared Prince of Wales and Earl of Chester on July 26, 1958, when he was nine years old (the position had been vacant since 1936, when the previous Prince of Wales ascended the throne as King Edward VIII), but the investiture ceremony was not carried out until Charles's 21st birthday. Prior to the ceremony, Welsh nationalists planted bombs to protest against the English prince's installation, and two employees of the town of Abergele, both members of the nationalist group Mudiad Amddiffyn Cymru, were killed while attempting to plant a gelignite bomb using nitroglycerin in a local hotel; eight hours after the ceremony, a British Army soldier was killed by a bomb when he started an Army van.
- Assignment of a "service number" for United States Army and United States Air Force personnel was discontinued more than 50 years after the first Army service number had been issued on February 28, 1918, though the U.S. Marines would continue to use numbers until the end of 1970 and the U.S. Navy until the end of 1971. The identifier, more commonly referred to as part of the "name, rank and serial number", was replaced with the service member's Social Security number for all people sworn in after midnight of June 1. Besides eliminating the 8-digit service number, the Army and Air Force also retired the prefixes (such as "RA" for "regular Army" for volunteers, "US" for draftees, "ER" for enlisted reservists, "O" for officer and "WA" for "women's Army"). In at least one location, the Richards-Gebaur Air Reserve Station in Missouri, induction was delayed so that one recruit could be sworn in before midnight on Monday and given the last service number, and another a few minutes later on Tuesday to be "given a Social Security number as his service number".

== July 2, 1969 (Wednesday) ==
- The Ireland cricket team surprised the world of cricket by scoring an upset against one of the five national teams that met regularly in test cricket matches, defeating the visiting West Indies team 125 runs to 25 in the first innings of an unofficial one day match.
- The newest and largest casino and resort in Las Vegas, the International Hotel, opened to guests. Renowned singer Barbra Streisand performed the first concert date to inaugurate the 1,510-room hotel, at the time the tallest building (30 stories) in Nevada.
- Born:
  - Tim Rodber, English rugby union flanker with 44 appearances for the national team; in Richmond, Yorkshire
  - Jenni Rivera, American Latin music singer; in Long Beach, California (killed in plane crash, 2012)
  - Matthew Cox, American white-collar criminal; in Tampa
- Died:
  - "Iron Mike" DiBiase, 45, American professional wrestler and former college wrestling champion; of a heart attack during a match in Lubbock, Texas. As the match began, DiBiase was preparing to fight Gary Fletcher, but before the two could grapple, DiBiase collapsed and fell backward out of the ring.
  - Mikio Naruse, 63, Japanese film producer

== July 3, 1969 (Thursday) ==
- The Soviet Union's race to land a man on the Moon, already far behind the American program, ended with the explosion after launch of its N1 rocket, the Soviet counterpart to the American Saturn V. Although the N1 was capable of carrying the mass of a large payload (an orbiting vehicle, a lunar lander and at least one cosmonauts) out of Earth orbit, the Soviets had yet to accomplish what the U.S. had done with Apollo 8 in December, putting men into orbit around the Moon. Although U.S. intelligence officials suspected that the launch had been a failure after noting that a mission had not taken place as expected, the extent of the failure would not be clear until six weeks later, when an analyst with the National Photographic Interpretation Center saw the damage from the explosion on film from an American spy satellite. Unlike Apollo 11, the Zond capsule on top of the N1 was uncrewed. An American CIA analyst would comment later in a top secret report that the unsuccessful launch "was probably intended to send an unmanned spacecraft to the vicinity of the moon and return it to earth" and that the blast heavily damaged the launch pad at Baikonur.
- A press release from Stanford University in Palo Alto, California, announced the existence of what would become the internet, with the note "Stanford University and the Stanford Research Institute, Menlo Park, will be tied in this fall to a nationwide network that for the first time will link together computers of different makes and machine 'languages.' The system will pool computer power programs and specialized know-how of about 15 computer research centers stretching from Massachusetts Institute of Technology to the California coast. Other California stations will be at the Rand Corp. and System Development Corp., both of Santa Monica; the Berkeley and Santa Barbara campuses of the University of California, and UCLA." A similar press release from the University of California, Los Angeles (UCLA), is cited in one source as the first mention of the internet.
- Died: Brian Jones, 27, English guitarist of The Rolling Stones, was found dead in his swimming pool at Hartfield, East Sussex a month after quitting the band to perform his own music. Jones was at his home, Cotchford Farm, a 16th-century estate where English author A. A. Milne had written his Winnie the Pooh stories. Jones's death at age 27, followed in succession by the deaths of three other 27-year old rock musicians — Jimi Hendrix, Janis Joplin and Jim Morrison— in the two-year period that followed, would give rise to the notion of the "27 Club", the concept that popular musicians were more likely to die after their 27th birthday and before they reached the 28th.

== July 4, 1969 (Friday) ==
- Michael Mageau, 19, became the first person to survive a murder attempt by a man who would become known as the "Zodiac Killer", and the first to provide a description to the police. Mageau and a friend, 22-year old Darlene Ferrin, were shot while sitting in Ferrin's car parked at a municipal park in Vallejo, California. The killer then called police from a pay phone near the Vallejo Police Department. Ferrin died at the hospital, but surgeons were able to save Mageau. On August 1, the Vallejo Times Herald and two San Francisco newspapers would receive letters from a man who would claim responsibility for Ferrin's murder and for the December 20 murder of two high school students in Benicia, along with a cryptogram, and demanded that the three papers publish the letters to avoid more murders.
- A sudden storm killed 42 people in Ohio and Michigan, many of them people who had been outside during American Independence Day celebrations. The National Weather Service received the first storm warnings at 7:33 in the evening, and told the Emergency Broadcast System to stand by for an alert to be sent, but never gave the go-ahead for a warning to be sent to people in and around Cleveland. Several people attending a Fourth of July event in neighboring Lakewood, Ohio, were killed when a tornado swept through the city park.
- Died: Ted Rhodes, 55, African-American professional golfer who challenged the PGA "Caucasians only" clause in the late 1940s.

== July 5, 1969 (Saturday) ==
- The Rolling Stones performed a live rock concert in front of at least 250,000 fans (and by some estimates, almost 500,000) at Hyde Park in London. The event was their first public concert in more than two years, and had originally been planned as the debut of guitarist Mick Taylor, who had joined the Stones after Brian Jones had quit the band in May. Jones would later die in an accident two days before the Hyde Park Festival. Lead singer Mick Jagger opened the show with a tribute to his late friend, telling the crowd to "Cool it for a minute, because I would really like to say something about Brian... I'm just going to say something that was written by Shelley." Jagger was referring to 19th century poet Percy Bysshe Shelley, and the crowd of rock and roll fans quietly listened to classical verse from Shelley's poem "Adonais", an elegy to another artist who had died young, John Keats. After the release of hundreds of butterflies, the Stones played 14 songs, starting with a cover of the Johnny Winter song "I'm Yours & I'm Hers".
- Tom Mboya, Kenya's Minister of Economic Planning and Development and one of the founders of the nation, was fatally shot while leaving a pharmacy in Nairobi. Mboya, considered by African observers to be the likely successor of Kenyan President Jomo Kenyatta, was approached by a young man who fired two bullets into his chest, and died after being taken to a hospital. The assassin was seen jumping into a car. A 32-year old member of the Kenya's majority Kikuyu tribe, Nahashon Njoroge, would be convicted of after the murder weapon was found under his bed with his fingerprints on it; Mboya was Luo, and second largest tribe was killed by a Kikuyu sent by Kikuyu Kenya's governing officials, was of the Luo tribe. He would be hanged in prison on November 8.
- The crew of Apollo 11 told a press conference in Houston that they had given names to the two lunar spacecraft. Mission commander Neil Armstrong told reporters that crew had christened the Apollo Lunar Module as Eagle, "since the eagle is the symbol of the flight", and the lunar orbiter was named for "Columbia, the statue that stands on top of our capitol. Columbia also was the name of Jules Verne's spacecraft that went to the Moon." Armstrong was arguably wrong on both counts, in that the statue is officially called the Statue of Freedom, and the name of type of cannon which launched the lunar ship in Verne's 1865 book From the Earth to the Moon was actually Columbiad.
- Born: RZA (stage name for Robert Fitzgerald Diggs), American rapper and de facto leader of the hip hop group Wu-Tang Clan; in Brooklyn
- Died:
  - Ben Alexander, 58, American TV and film actor known as Jack Webb's costar in the original Dragnet TV and radio series; of a heart attack
  - Leo McCarey, 70, American film director and three time Oscar-winner
  - Tom Mboya, 38, Kenyan Justice Minister and national economist
  - Lambert Hillyer, 75, American film director
  - Walter Gropius, 66, German architect

== July 6, 1969 (Sunday) ==
- One of the Soviet Central Television networks gave viewers "their first look at nude movies and sex magazines", unprecedented in the network's broadcasting and a shock to Russian society's normally prudish attitudes toward sex. Western observers concluded that the late evening show was intended for propaganda purposes, and that "Its apparent aim was to put America in a bad light by shocking puritanical Russians". Nude scenes from the recently produced off-Broadway play Oh! Calcutta! were shown, along with the recent film Che!, along with photographs of "sex magazine covers with unclad men and women" that "appeared to have been photographed through the windows of midtown bookshops in New York City". The show's narrator informed viewers that "The American public loves this." The narrator also described Oh! Calcutta! as "the most repulsive" example of the "erotic revolution" in the United States.
- Air South Flight 168, part of the fleet of a commuter airline founded earlier in the year, crashed near Monroe, Georgia, killing all 12 passengers and both the crew. The twin-engine Beechcraft Model 99 airplane had taken off from Atlanta at about 9:00 p.m. and was scheduled to land at an airfield in Greer, South Carolina when it went down in a swampy area.
- The final vestige of the penny arcade era was quietly retired as the last known one-cent machine, a "fortune teller" that dispensed tickets for one penny, was removed and replaced by a newer version that cost five cents.
- Died: Sister Laura Latorre Mendoza, 91, Philippine Roman Catholic missionary

== July 7, 1969 (Monday) ==
- French joined English as one of the two official languages of Canada as the House of Commons approved the Official Languages Act on its third and final reading. By the time the reading was completed, only 45 of the 264 members remained (16 from the ruling Liberal Party, 17 from the opposing Progressive Conservative Party (the Tories) and 12 from the moderately liberal New Democratic Party. An hour before the vote, opponents made one last effort to delay when one Tory MP unsuccessfully moved to defer the final reading until the Supreme Court of Canada decide on the measure's constitutionality. Under the new law, government services in both languages was to be offered in any designated "bilingual districts" in "areas where 10 percent or more of the population speaks the official language not spoken by the majority." There were no "nays" heard on the voice vote, though at least one PC member said in advance that we would abstain. Canada's Senate would approved the next day, the Governor General gave Royal Assent on July 9, and the law would come into effect 90 days later on September 7.
- Twenty-one coal miners in Taiwan were killed, and 59 others injured, in a methane gas explosion 22 miles (35 km) west of the capital at Taipei.
- Born:
  - Sylke Otto, German luge athlete, winner of four world championships and two Olympic gold medals; in Karl-Marx-Stadt, East Germany (now Chemnitz, Germany)
  - Cree Summer, American and Canadian voice actress; in Los Angeles
- Died: Erskine Sanford, American actor (b. 1885)

== July 8, 1969 (Tuesday) ==
- Arthur Nathaniel Aiken and Antonio Nathaniel Wheat were both spared execution only three days before they were scheduled to be hanged at the Washington State Penitentiary in Walla Walla. The double hanging had been set for 12:01 on the morning of Friday, July 11, and the two former airmen would have been the first prisoners to be put to death since Luis Monge in 1967. Warden Robert Rhay told reporters that Wheat and Aiken would be given the option to decide which one would be executed first and that if they were unable to agree on the sequence, Rhay would "flip a coin". Aiken was granted a stay of execution by U.S. Supreme Court Justice William O. Douglas (who happened to be vacationing at his summer home in Goose Prairie, Washington) less than 72 hours before his trip to the gallows; Wheat had been given a temporary reprieve by Potter Stewart the day before. The United States Supreme Court would void all pending death sentences in 1972, and the two inmates, convicted of a triple homicide, would serve consecutive life sentences instead.
- American nerve gas weapons were accidentally released from their containers by a crew of U.S. Air Force members at Kadena Air Base on the Japanese island of Okinawa. The mishap, which injured 23 troops and a civilian, involved either VX or Sarin, both nerve agents. Henry Kissinger, the National Security Adviser to U.S. President Richard Nixon, would later blame the accident on an unidentified Air Force major "whose aesthetic sense exceeded his judgment" and who had ordered the troops "to have the canisters painted white" and that some of the drums were punctured during the sandblasting that preceded the painting. Despite attempts by the military to keep the incident secret (including plans to dump the damaged nerve gas containers into the ocean), The Wall Street Journal exposed the story ten days later in an article headlined "Nerve gas accident— Okinawa mishap bears overseas deployment of chemical weapons".
- On July 8 and 9, the results of a dry Orbital Workshop (OWS) study effort performed by Kennedy Space Center (KSC), Marshall Space Flight Center (MSFC), Manned Spacecraft Center (MSC), and major Apollo Applications Program (AAP) contractors were presented to the Manned Space Flight Management Council. The basic dry OWS configuration and associated cost and schedule estimates resulting from the study were discussed and approved. The AAP Director then presented the proposal to the NASA Administrator.
- The first of 25,000 American troops to be withdrawn from the Vietnam War arrived at McChord Air Force Base in the state of Washington, south of Seattle, at 6:30 in the evening, when a C-141 transport plane, one of nine to land at McChord, arrived. The drawdown, announced a month earlier, would be completed in a little more than seven weeks with the departure on August 28 of the 25,000th soldier; most of the troops would come from the U.S. Army 9th Infantry Division and from some U.S. Marine air squadron units.
- The International Ice Hockey Federation ended its ban against professional players playing in the annual world championship competition, starting in 1970. Meeting at the alpine resort town of Crans-sur-Sierre in Switzerland, the IIHF delegates voted 26–25 in favor of allowing each nation to have as many as nine professional or former pros on its squad, provided that the player had not played actively in the National Hockey League during its 1969–70 season prior to the start of the tournament.
- West German millionaire Hannsheinz Porst, arrested on October 23, 1967 for passing West German documents to the Communist government of East Germany from his chain of photography supply stores, was convicted of espionage by a court in Bonn. He was sentenced by a court in Karlsruhe to 2½ years in prison.
- Born:
  - Sugizo (Yūne Sugihara), Japanese musician, songwriter, composer and record producer; in Hadano, Kanagawa
  - Rachael Lillis, American voice actress, in Niagara Falls, New York (d. 2024)
  - Chucky Mullins, American football player for Ole Miss (d. 1991); in Russellville, Alabama

== July 9, 1969 (Wednesday) ==
- Hall of fame rock group Vanilla Fudge arrived four hours late for their concert at the Blossom Amphitheater at Northampton Township outside of Cleveland, after driving to North Hampton, Ohio, population 489, and located 200 miles (320 km) away. Vocalist Mark Stein told a reporter later, "You understand, man, that the promoter kept telling our agent about Blossom Center in Northampton Township. Only we were up in Montreal, and looking at a map to find the place and sure enough — there's this town, North Hampton, near Dayton somewhere. We figured, that's a weird place for a concert, but if that's where peoples' heads are at in Ohio, fine — that's where we'll wail." The sellout crowd remained until the band began playing at 12:30 in the morning.
- Pitcher Tom Seaver of the New York Mets kept 25 consecutive Chicago Cubs batters from reaching base and needed just two more to record what would have been only the tenth perfect game in Major League Baseball history. With one out in the ninth inning, little-used rookie Jim Qualls connected on Seaver's first pitch and reached first base for the Cubs' only hit of the game at New York's Shea Stadium.
- Born: Sarah Koenig, American radio journalist, in New York City
- Died: Rear Admiral Raizo Tanaka, 77, Japanese Imperial Navy fleet commander during World War II, nicknamed "Tenacious Tanaka"

== July 10, 1969 (Thursday) ==
- The Teignmouth Electron, a trimaran sailboat operated by businessman Donald Crowhurst and one of the remaining competitors in round-the-world solo voyage, was found adrift by a British freighter, Picardy, but Crowhurst, the favorite in the race for fastest crossing, was nowhere to be found. Crowhurst, who had last been seen on July 7 at a point 600 miles (970 km) west of the Azores Islands in the North Atlantic Ocean, had been one of the six entrants in the Sunday Times Golden Globe Race, which offered a £5,000 prize for the fastest circumnavigation of the globe, and Robin Knox-Johnston had already finished the race on April 22. The trimaran had drifted further away from its destination in the three days since Crowhurst had been seen, and the Picardy found it 700 miles (1,100 km) west of the Azores. The boat's sails were set, its contents were intact, including Crowhurst's personal papers, films, audiotapes, the log of the voyage and the life raft and the dinghy that would have been necessary to safely abandon ship. The conclusion was that Crowhurst, known to be despondent over debt from a failing business, had committed suicide. Three days after the Teignmouth Electron was found, race winner Knox-Johnston donated his £5,000 prize money (for finishing the race first) to a fund set up by the Sunday Times to aid Crowhurst's widow and four children.
- The first parade for Vietnam War veterans took place, with the men of the 3rd Battalion, 60th Brigade of the 9th Infantry Division of the United States Army marching through Seattle to the cheers of supporters and the booing of demonstrators from the Seattle Anti-War Action Movement.
- At 8:00 p.m., the countdown began at five days, 13 hours and 32 minutes for the 9:32 a.m. launch on July 16 of the Apollo 11 mission.
- Born:
  - Rami Makhlouf, Syrian business magnate; in Damascus
  - Jonas Kaufmann, German operatic tenor; in Munich

== July 11, 1969 (Friday) ==
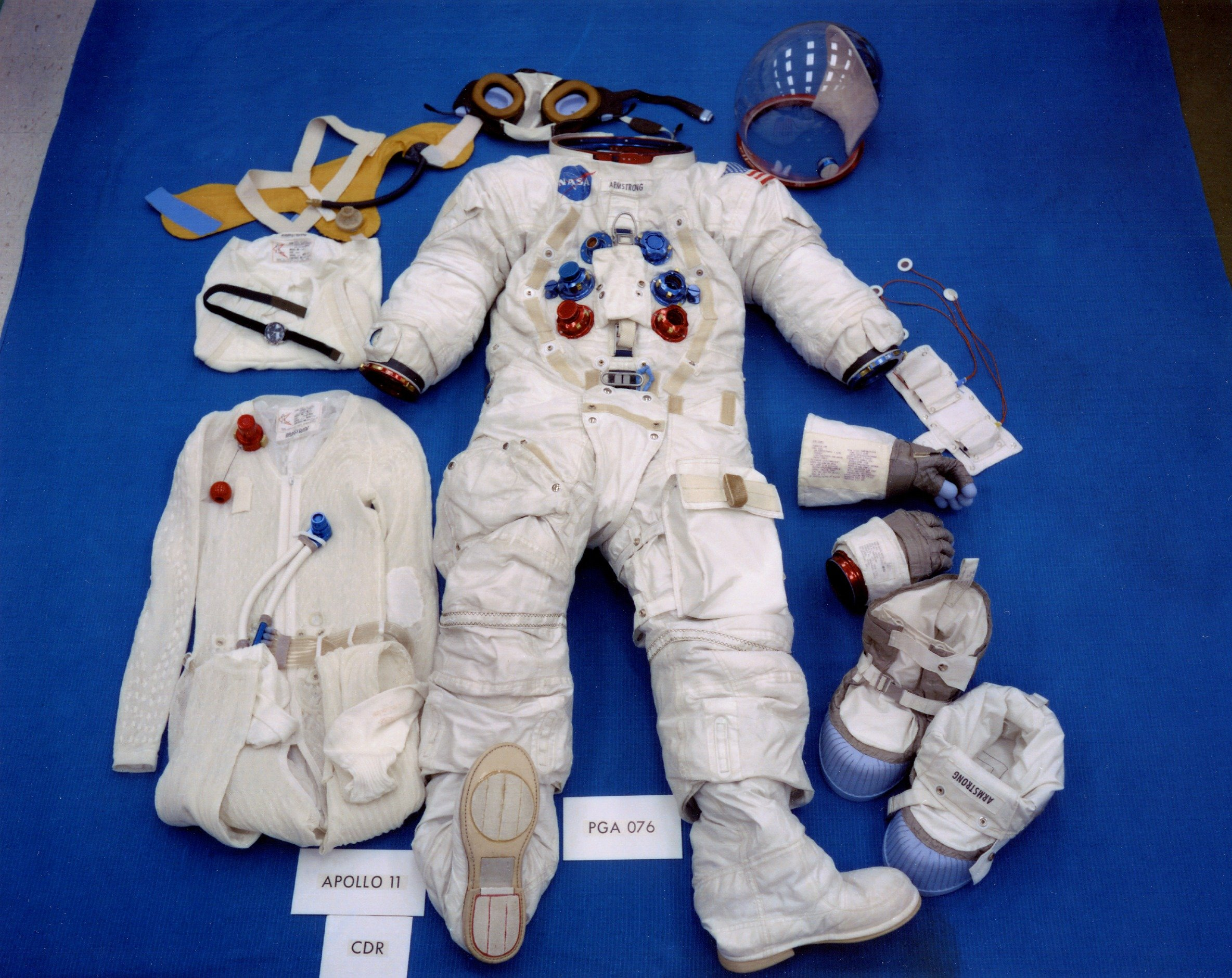
Neil Armstrong's A7L space suit

- MSC terminated the development of the A9L space suit. The A7L space suit, used in the Apollo program, would continue in use until replaced by a flight-qualified, constant-volume suit. During the Mercury program a modified version of the Goodrich Navy Mark IV suit was used. In the Gemini program a modified version of a suit developed by David Clark Company for the USAF was used. Hamilton Standard had overall development responsibility for the Apollo suit and associated portable life support system. A subcontract was awarded to International Latex Corporation for development of this suit. After suit development was completed, the production contract was awarded to International Latex, and the initial suit was designated A5L. The A6L design incorporated a thermal/meteoroid garment. Following the Apollo 1 fire, the suit was redesigned to eliminate flammable materials and was designated A7L (designation A8L was never used). Two hard-shell, constant-volume suits were under development; an extravehicular suit was being developed by Litton Industries, and an intravehicular suit was being developed by AiResearch Corporation. Both of the latter would be used in the Apollo Applications Program.
- The Sprague Electric Company delivered a 1.5-inch (38 mm) diameter silicon disc to NASA, containing 73 "messages of good will from the leaders of the world's nations to be flown and left on the Moon," that had been inscribed microscopically. The medallion was placed on a package adhered to one of the sleeves of Buzz Aldrin's space suit and was almost forgotten until Aldrin was climbing back into the lunar module before for departure on July 21. Neil Armstrong reminded Aldrin of "that package" and Aldrin tossed it on to the lunar surface.
- Philips Records released David Bowie's song "Space Oddity" (about a fictional astronaut, "Major Tom") in conjunction with the expected launch of the Apollo 11 mission to the Moon. Bowie had recorded the song three weeks earlier.
- Born: David Tao (Tao Xuzhong), Taiwanese R&B singer and songwriter; in Hong Kong

== July 12, 1969 (Saturday) ==
- Nearly four months after its cancellation by NBC, Star Trek was introduced to British television viewers. Its run on BBC-1 began with the pilot episode "Where No Man Has Gone Before" (unlike the original U.S. run, which had opted for "The Man Trap"). Filling in as a summer replacement for Doctor Who between that show's sixth and seventh seasons, the programme was shown in the Doctor Who 5:15 p.m. time slot between afternoon sports and the 10-minute BBC news and weather update.

== July 13, 1969 (Sunday) ==
- The Soviet Union launched the uncrewed lunar spacecraft Luna 15, three days before the scheduled liftoff of the American Apollo 11 crewed mission to the Moon, with the objective of performing a sample-return mission and bringing back the first lunar soil (a "Moon rock") ahead of the United States. Course corrections were done to place Luna 15 into lunar orbit at 16 kilometres (9.9 mi) altitude and on a different orbital plane than the Apollo 11 16.9 kilometres (10.5 mi) altitude above the lunar surface, and to land at the Mare Crisium after the American lunar module's landing at the Mare Tranquillitatis to depart first. However, what an author would describe later as something that "would have been an engineering triumph if it had worked" failed when Luna 15 crashed upon landing.
- Born: Ken Jeong, American TV and film comedian; as Kendrick Kang-Joh Jeong in Detroit, Michigan
- Died: Muhammad Shahidullah, 84, Bengali educator, linguist and author

== July 14, 1969 (Monday) ==
El Salvador

Honduras

- Bombers, tanks and army troops from El Salvador staged a surprise attack on neighboring Honduras in what would later be called the "Football War" or "Soccer War" because it came a few weeks after El Salvador's defeat of Honduras during the qualifying rounds for soccer football's 1970 World Cup. The Honduras government said that troops crossed into the Honduran border town of Amatillo in the south and El Poy in the west, and that bombs had been dropped on the cities of Nueva Ocotepeque, Santa Rosa de Copán, Gracias and Choluteca. Before a ceasefire could be negotiated on July 18, the war would leave "4,000 dead, the number being about equally divided between the two sides and including civilians killed."
- Heydar Aliyev became the most powerful politician in Azerbaijan (at the time, one of the constituent republics of the USSR), after he was elevated to the position of General Secretary of the Communist Party of the Azerbaijan SSR. After the breakup of the Soviet Union, Aliyev would serve as President of Azerbaijan from 1993 to 2003.
- The modern U.S. "war on drugs" began as U.S. President Nixon sent a message to Congress calling for "a comprehensive legislative proposal" to control narcotics and to "place in a single statute, a revised and modern plan for control". Congress would pass the Controlled Substances Act in 1970.
- Rizal Technological University, located in the Philippines in the Manila suburb of Mandaluyong, held its first classes, as "The College of Rizal". It now has more than 30,000 students.
- U.S. Treasury Secretary David M. Kennedy announced that the United States Mint would discontinue issuing United States currency in amounts higher than $100.
- Died: "Clarence", 7, an American lion who had appeared in the 1965 children's film Clarence, the Cross-Eyed Lion and for four seasons in the CBS television show Daktari. Often on tour at various expositions during his career, Clarence died in Peoria, Illinois where he had been scheduled to appear at the Heart of Illinois Fair.

== July 15, 1969 (Tuesday) ==
- One month before the Woodstock Festival rock concert was to take place, the zoning board of the town of Wallkill, New York, banned Woodstock Ventures from using land that the organizers had leased and had cleared. The legendary rock concert would take place instead at a farm near Bethel, New York, 40 miles (64 km) away. At the time that the event had been barred from Wallkill, advance tickets had been sold at prices of up to $18.50 for all three days (equivalent to $128 in 2019), and the plan was to have music only during the hours between 2:00 in the afternoon to 2:00 the next morning. By the time Woodstock took place, most of the 400,000 people in attendance had gotten in without paying.
- A number of organizations were studying the possibility of zero-g showers for use in human spaceflight. In a letter to J. Hall of Langley Research Center (LaRC), C. C. Johnson (MSC) wrote: "MSC has some excellent films of Jack Slight showering in the KC-135 at zerogravity. The motion pictures of Jack showering are quite revealing-not of Jack, of the action of water at zero-gravity.... The interesting point is that the water strikes Jack, bounces off in droplets, but then recollects as jelly-like globs on various parts of his body. He can brush the water away but it will soon reattach elsewhere."
- A 58-year-old South African woman in Johannesburg made headlines worldwide by claiming that she had become the oldest person to give birth to a child, delivered at home by a friend after she was not able to arrive at the hospital in time to deliver the 5-pound (2.3 kg) girl. Five days later, a pair of newspapers — The Sunday Tribune of Durban and Dagbreek en Sondagnuus of Johannesburg — exposed the story as a hoax.
- U.S. President Richard Nixon and his wife Pat Nixon became the owners of a vacation home in San Clemente, California that would be nicknamed "The Western White House" at times when he was on vacation from living at the White House in Washington, D.C. The Nixons had purchased the 10-room mansion and grounds from the Hamilton Cotton Estate for a reported $340,000.
- The city of Whittier, Alaska, was incorporated.

== July 16, 1969 (Wednesday) ==
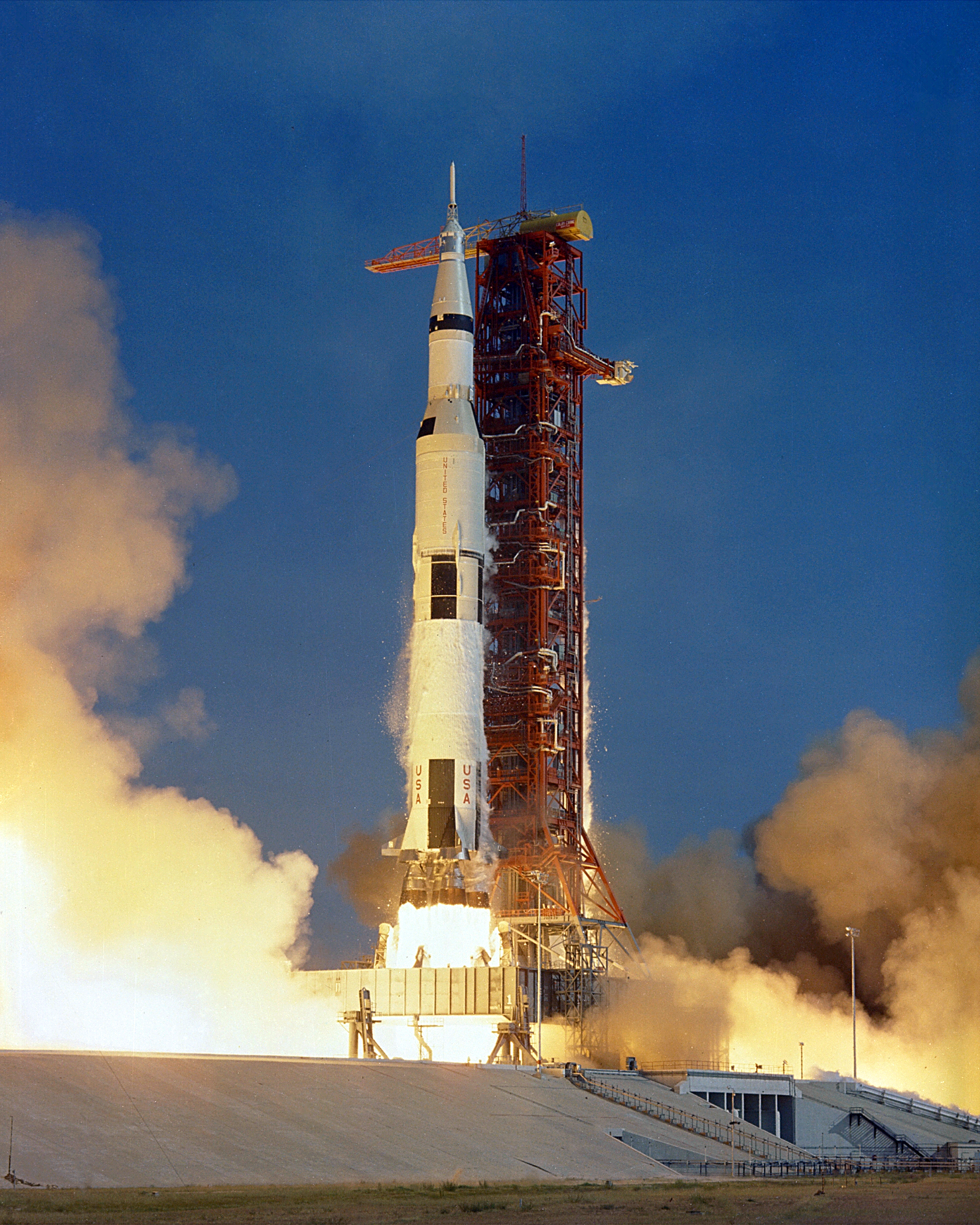
July 16, 1969: Launch of Apollo 11

North America taken July 16 during the translunar part of the journey

- Apollo 11, with Neil Armstrong, Buzz Aldrin and Michael Collins, lifted off as scheduled from Kennedy Space Center Launch Complex 39A in Florida at 9:32 a.m. local time (1332 UTC). Almost 12 minutes later, at 1343 UTC, the ship entered Earth orbit and, after more than two and a half hours, began "translunar injection", departing Earth orbit toward the Moon at 1622 UTC.

== July 17, 1969 (Thursday) ==
- The New York Times published one of the most famous retractions in history in the form of an editorial titled "A Correction". Noting that "On Jan. 13, 1920, 'Topics of The Times'.... commented on the ideas of Robert H. Goddard, the rocket pioneer", when the Times said that "Professor Goddard... does not know... of the need to have something better than a vacuum against which to react... he only seems to lack the knowledge ladled out daily in high schools." Writing on the day after the launch of Apollo 11 to the Moon, the Times commented that "it is now definitely established that a rocket can function in a vacuum as in an atmosphere. The Times regrets the error." Goddard had died in 1945.
- Ahmad Rageh Namer and his two adult sons, Hussein and Abdo, were all found not guilty of charges that they had conspired to assassinate then-President-Elect Richard Nixon in November 1968. The three men were acquitted by a New York State Supreme Court jury of three charges, but were found guilty of being in possession of switchblade knives. Their defense attorney made the case that the informant who had accused them of conspiring to assassinate Nixon was motivated by a grudge that he held against Namer and his family.
- The Soviet Union's uncrewed lunar probe Luna 15 entered lunar orbit two days ahead of the crewed American Apollo 11 mission.

== July 18, 1969 (Friday) ==
- U.S. President Nixon's speechwriter, William Safire, submitted a memo to White House Chief of Staff H. R. Haldeman, titled "In Event of Moon Disaster". Although several uncrewed spacecraft had landed on the Moon, none had ever departed the Moon, and there was uncertainty over whether the engines of the lunar lander could provide enough thrust to propel it back into orbit. The memo outlined recommendations, including a draft of prepared remarks for the President to deliver, if astronauts Armstrong and Aldrin were unable to bring the lunar module back off of the Moon after landing. The existence of the memo, drafted at Haldeman's request on the advice of former astronaut Frank Borman, would not be revealed for nearly 30 years, until a Los Angeles Times reporter, Jim Mann, ran across the correspondence in the National Archives. Fortunately, Nixon never had to deliver the remarks that would have started, "Fate has ordained that the men who went to the moon to explore in peace will stay on the moon to rest in peace. These brave men, Neil Armstrong and Edwin Aldrin, know that there is no hope for their recovery. But they also know that there is hope for mankind in their sacrifice."
- Nineteen young teenagers drowned in France while wading in the Loire River near the village of Juigné-sur-Loire. The group, consisting of 13- and 14-year-old children from a group of sixty at a recreation center in the town of Angers, had been walking in shallow waters when the gravel riverbed beneath them gave way and swept them downstream.
- El Salvador and Honduras agreed to a ceasefire to halt the "Football War" after 100 hours of fighting, in a pact brokered by the Organization of American States. The cessation of hostilities took place at 10:00 in the evening local time (0700 UTC July 19).
- NASA Administrator Thomas O. Paine approved the shift from a "wet" to a "dry" Orbital Workshop concept for AAP following a review presentation by program officials on the potential benefits of such a change.
- Born: The Great Sasuke (ring name for Masanori Murkakawa), Japanese professional wrestler; in Morioka, Tōhoku
- Died:
  - Mary Jo Kopechne, 27, American campaign worker and secretary; by drowning
  - Barbara Pepper, 54, American stage, film and TV actress; of a heart attack

== July 19, 1969 (Saturday) ==
- Police from Edgartown, Massachusetts came to the scene of an automobile accident on Chappaquiddick Island, and found the body of 27-year old secretary Mary Jo Kopechne inside an Oldsmobile 88 automobile that had fallen into a deep pond. Afterward, U.S. Senator Edward "Teddy" Kennedy reported that he had accidentally driven off of a bridge ten hours earlier and that he had escaped the car, leaving Miss Kopechne inside, left the scene, and gone back to his bedroom to sleep. The senator's explanation for failing to report the event for 10 hours was that he had been "in shock".
- Juan de Borbon, Count of Barcelona and pretender to the throne of Spain since the 1941 death of his father, King Alfonso XIII, renounced all claims to be the nation's monarch. After criticizing Spain's president and dictator, Francisco Franco, for planning to make Don Juan's son (who would become King Juan Carlos in 1975) as Franco's successor, the man who would have been King Juan III disbanded the 80-member privy council and the 20-member political secretariat that he had maintained during his 28-year attempt at a government in exile.
- John Fairfax became the first person to make a solo trip across an ocean in a rowboat, arriving at Hollywood Beach, Florida, 180 days after departing Las Palmas in the Canary Islands. His feat was overshadowed by the first crewed landing on the Moon the next day; as one newspaper editorial noted, "On another day, John Fairfax might have made bigger headlines... But Mr. Fairfax happened to beach his rowboat on a Florida beach on Saturday, while the whole world had nothing on its mind except the moon."
- At 1727 UTC (1:27 p.m. EDT in the United States), Apollo 11 completed its six-minute "lunar orbit insertion" maneuver and began orbiting the Moon in preparation for the landing of the lunar module.
- India's Prime Minister Indira Gandhi ordered the nationalization of 14 private banks that comprised 70 percent of the deposits in the nation.
- Born: Chris Kratt, American zoologist and educational nature show host; in Warren Township, New Jersey

== July 20, 1969 (Sunday) ==
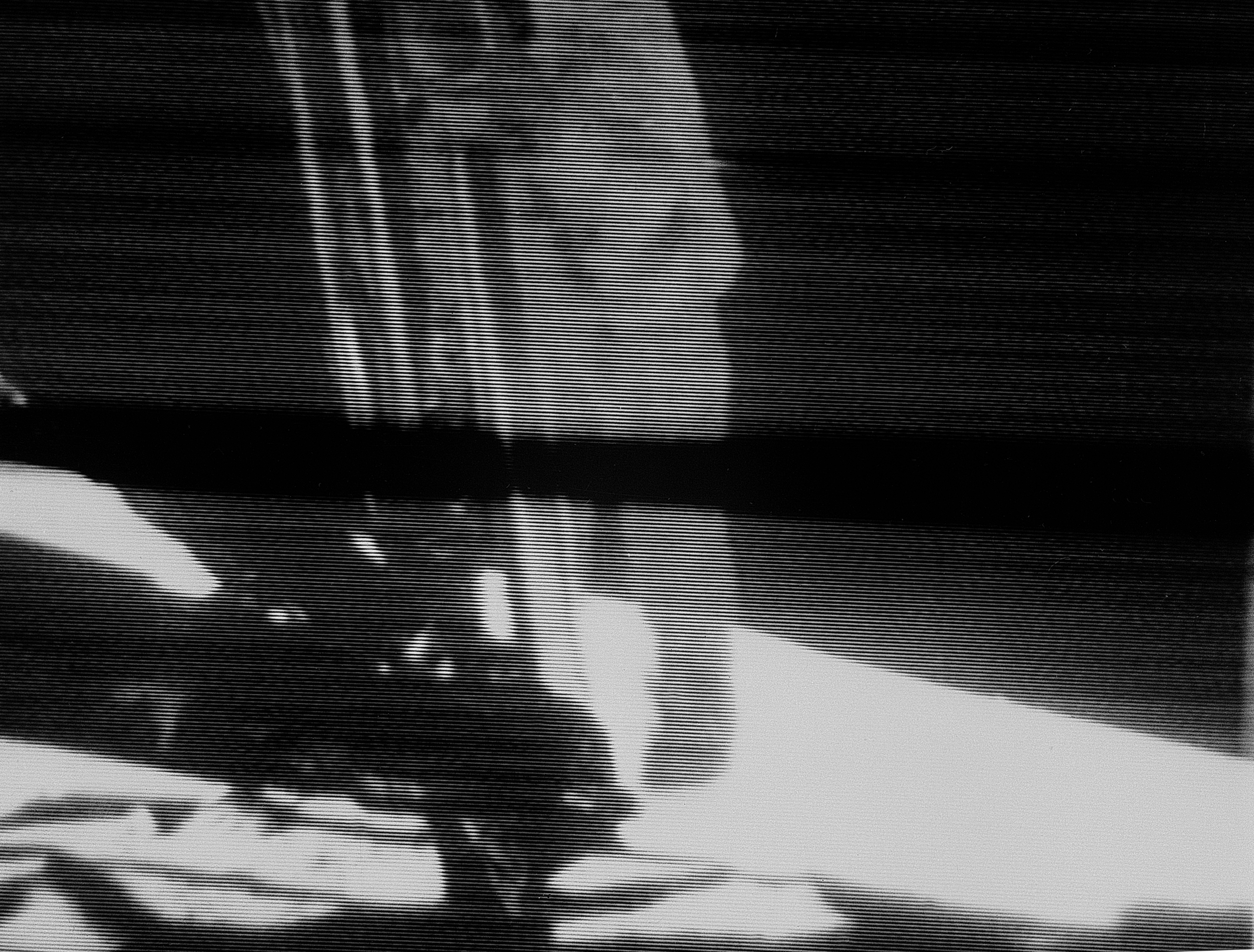
The live TV image

- As the world watched on live television, Neil A. Armstrong piloted the descent of the Apollo 11 Lunar Module Eagle, and, at 4:17 in the afternoon EDT (2017 UTC), he and Edwin "Buzz" Aldrin became the first human beings to land on another world. The third member of the crew, Michael Collins, continued to orbit the Moon in the command module Columbia. Aldrin and Armstrong had entered Eagle at 1502 UTC and Eagle separated from Columbia at 1812 UTC, then began its two-hour descent from orbit at 1908 UTC, landing at 20:17:39 UTC. The Eagle touched down in the Mare Tranquillitatis, 15 kilometres (9.3 mi) south of a crater called "Sabine D", which would later be renamed the Collins crater.
- At the time of the landing, the Moon and the two astronauts were 393,309 kilometres (244,391 mi) from the Earth. Collins, alone in Columbia for twenty-one and a half hours, maintained an orbit ranging from 100 kilometres (62 mi) to 122 kilometres (76 mi), and when he was on the far side of the 3,476 kilometres (2,160 mi) diameter Moon, was at least 3,576 kilometres (2,222 mi) away from the nearest human being, "with no radio contact with Earth or his crewmates and a 2100 mile-wide ball of rock between him and every other human who ever lived."
- The Royal Rainmaking Project of Thailand was carried out for the first time as an airplane attempted cloud seeding, with dry ice, over the Khao Yai National Park in a drought-stricken area with some success in making rain fall, though not over the target area. The project, commenced at the behest of the King in 1955, would continue its research on rainmaking techniques.
- Born: Josh Holloway, American TV actor; in San Jose, California
- Died: Cathy Wayne, 19, (stage name for Catherine Warnes), Australian singer, was shot to death by a U.S. Marine sergeant while singing at a night club for U.S. non-commissioned officers of the U.S. Marines 1st Reconnaissance battalion near Da Nang in South Vietnam.

== July 21, 1969 (Monday) ==
- At 0256 UTC (10:56 p.m. Eastern Daylight Time (EDT) in the United States), a person from Earth set foot on the Moon for the first time. Neil A. Armstrong, commander of the Apollo 11 crewed mission, took several minutes to climb down the module's ladder before setting foot on the lunar surface. Although Armstrong said later that he intended to say that the act was "one small step for a man" for the first words heard on Earth from the Moon, what listeners heard (and the press reported the next day) in the transmission was the phrase "That's one small step for man, one giant leap for mankind." After his return to Earth, he commented that he had said "a man" and that "It's just that people just didn't hear it."
- In what NASA considered to be the most dangerous part of the Apollo 11 mission, Edwin "Buzz" Aldrin and Neil Armstrong became the first people to use rockets to lift off from somewhere other than Earth, departing the lunar surface at 17:54 UTC (1:54 p.m. EDT) in order to return to the orbiting command module. Earlier in the day, Armstrong deployed a camera (0302 UTC) and collected the first samples of lunar soil (0305 to 0309); Aldrin became the second person to set foot on the Moon (0315 UTC, 11:15 p.m. EDT July 20). The astronauts unveiled a plaque that said "We came in peace for all mankind" (0324 UTC), deployed the United States flag (0341 UTC), received a phone call from U.S. President Richard Nixon (0348 to 0350 UTC), collected more lunar soil (0352 to 0407 UTC), and placed a seismometer (0427) and a retro-reflector on the surface (0435). Aldrin climbed back into the lunar lander (0501) followed by Armstrong (0509) and the two astronauts closed the hatch (0511). The crew then slept on the Moon, inside the landing vehicle, until beginning the sequence to depart (amid concerns on Earth that they would not be able to launch and would be stranded on the Moon for the rest of their lives). With Aldrin piloting, the Eagle docked again with Columbia at 2135 UTC, and Armstrong (at 2252) and Aldrin (at 2317) re-joined Collins in the lunar orbiter.
- Luna 15, the uncrewed Soviet lunar probe, crashed on the Moon at 1554 UTC (6:54 p.m. Moscow time, 11:50 a.m. in Washington). The probe, intended to scoop up samples of the lunar soil and bring the matter back to Earth, failed when its retrorockets failed to slow its descent, and apparently continued at a speed of 300 miles per hour (480 km/h) into the Mare Crisium, about 500 miles (800 km) northeast of the Apollo 11 landing site.
- Born:
  - Isabell Werth, German equestrian, gold medalist in five Olympic games and five world championships; in Issum, West Germany
  - Avraam Russo, Syrian-born Russian pop music singer; in Aleppo
- Died: A. D. King, 38, American civil rights activist, Baptist minister, and younger brother of the late Martin Luther King Jr., was found dead in his home's swimming pool in Atlanta.

== July 22, 1969 (Tuesday) ==
- NASA formally announced the AAP project reorientation to the "dry" Workshop configuration. AAP Director William C. Schneider ordered program managers at the three Centers to implement the change, abandoning the idea of using a spent Saturn IB second stage for a Workshop and adopting the concept of a fully equipped "dry" configuration - with the fully outfitted workshop and the Apollo Telescope Mount (ATM) integrated into the total payload - launched aboard a Saturn V. Schneider ordered the Centers to reorient their respective programs, both in house and under contract, as necessary, to accommodate the new program plan. The Workshop would be placed in a circular orbit first. About a day later, the three-person crew would ride aboard a Saturn IB into orbit to link up with the Workshop-ATM cluster, thus beginning the crewed portion of the mission. AAP changed from five to four launches, since a separate launch vehicle was not required to launch the ATM; Launch Complex 39 at KSC would be required for AAP, although Complex 37 would not be needed. The LM would no longer be required to house the ATM. Although these changes left basic program objectives unchanged, a secondary objective of an uncrewed rendezvous between the LM/ATM and the cluster was eliminated. Finally, the launch date for the first AAP flight was slipped from November 1971 to July 1972.
- Spain's parliament, the Cortes, voted 491 to 19 to approve the proposal by Chief of State Francisco Franco to designate Spanish Army Captain Juan Carlos de Borbon, 31, as Franco's successor and to restore the monarchy upon Franco's death or retirement. Though Spain had become a republic in 1936 when Franco overthrew Juan Carlos's grandfather, King Alfonso XIII, a referendum sponsored by Franco in 1947 had approved the restoration of the monarchy and the designation of President Franco as the Caudillo. The next day, Juan Carlos took an oath and was sworn in as Príncipe de España, the Prince of Spain.
- The major American cigarette manufacturers agreed to stop advertising on radio and television after September 30, 1970, in return for assurance from the United States government that warnings on the side of cigarette packages would not be sought until July 1971.
- Apollo 11 departed from lunar orbit and began its return to Earth at 0458 UTC (12:58 a.m. EDT).
- Born:
  - Jason Becker, American heavy metal guitarist whose career was cut short by ALS; in Richmond, California
  - James Arnold Taylor, American voice actor; in Santa Barbara, California
  - Despina Vandi, German-born Greek singer; in Tübingen, West Germany

== July 23, 1969 (Wednesday) ==
- The seventh and last of the "Co-ed Murders" took place. All of the victims were young female students in southeastern Michigan. In 1967 and 1968, two students at Eastern Michigan University (EMU) had been killed in a similar fashion. From March 20, 1969, two girls and three college students were killed. Karen Sue Beineman, like three of the others killed, had been an EMU student in Ypsilanti. On August 1, another EMU student, 22-year-old John Norman Collins, would be arrested and charged with Beineman's murder. Though suspected by police in the other murders, Collins would only be tried and convicted for Beineman's killing and would be sentenced to life imprisonment.
- Americans in several groups were permitted to travel to the People's Republic of China for the first time in almost 20 years, two days after President Nixon and U.S. Secretary of State William P. Rogers had announced a change in policy. Under the new rules, members of Congress, journalists, physicians, professional teachers, college students, scholars with a post-graduate degree, scientists, and representatives of the American Red Cross would be allowed to go to the Communist-ruled PRC without a pre-arranged passport validation from the United States. At the time, however, the Chinese government still denied most requests from Americans to enter the country.
- NASA announced selection of two aerospace firms -- McDonnell Douglas and North American—to conduct phase B planning studies of 12-man orbiting space stations that could be developed by the mid-1970s. The parallel 11-month program definition studies were a prelude to even larger semipermanent space bases during the later 1970s and 1980s.
- Born: John Cariani, American stage and TV actor; in Brockton, Massachusetts

== July 24, 1969 (Thursday) ==
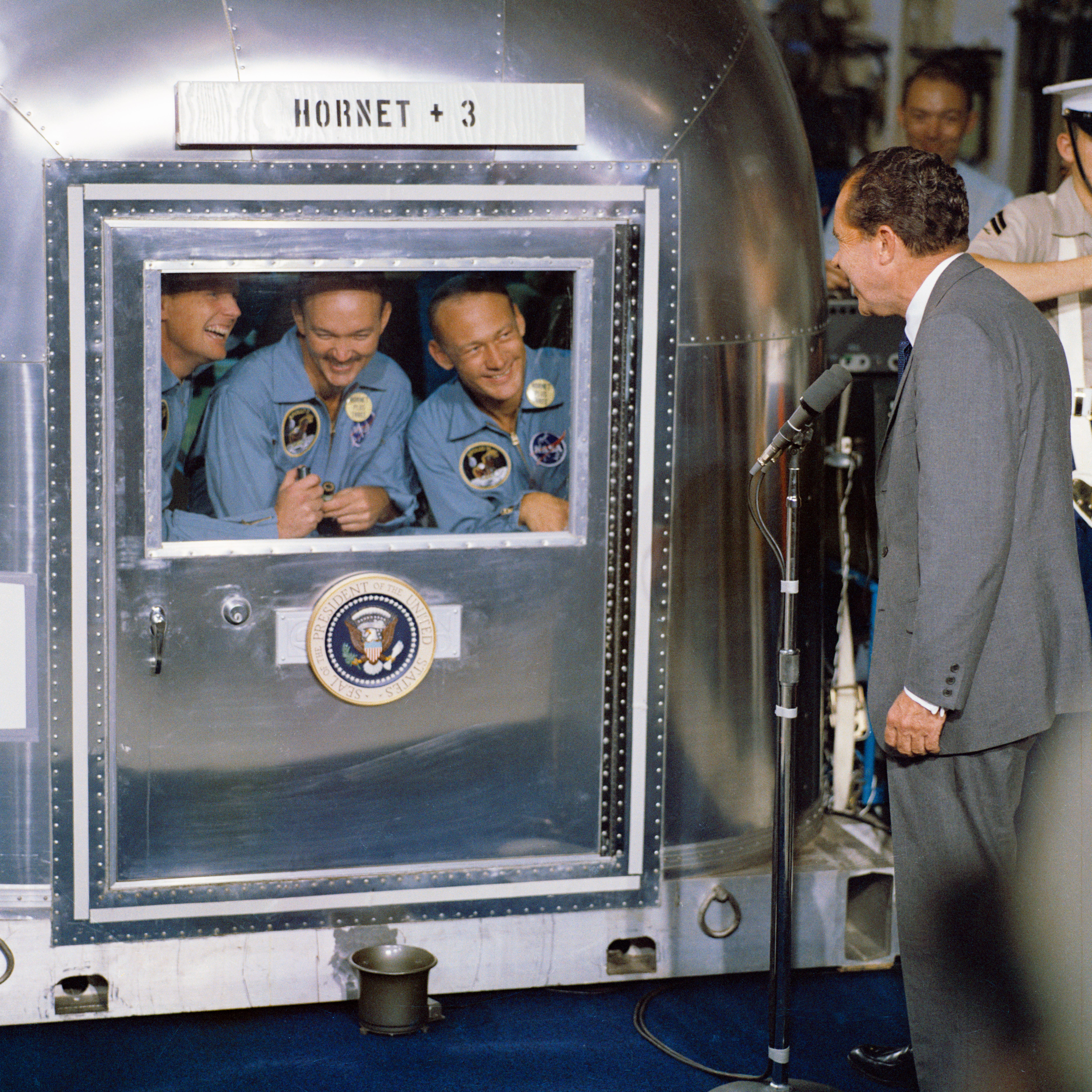
Quarantined astronauts

- The Apollo 11 crew splashed down in the South Pacific Ocean at 1650 UTC (5:50 in the morning local time) at a point 235 miles (378 km) south of Johnston Atoll, and was recovered at 17:29 by the aircraft carrier USS Hornet. At 17:58, five minutes after stepping onto the ship, the three astronauts proceeded from their ship into a mobile quarantine facility for 17 days as a precaution against having brought any contamination from the Moon back to Earth. U.S. President Nixon, who was en route to Asia on a state tour of several nations, greeted the astronauts on the Hornet, speaking to them from outside of the window of the "isolation van" and told them "This is the greatest week in the history of the world since the Creation. As a result of what you have done, the world has never been closer together."
- NASA announced that the next crewed mission to the Moon, Apollo 12, would be launched on November 14. Mission commander Charles "Pete" Conrad and lunar module pilot Alan L. Bean were identified as the astronauts to become the third and fourth, respectively, to walk on the Moon, while Richard F. Gordon would remain in orbit in the command module. All three of the Apollo 12 astronauts were officers in the United States Navy; Conrad and Gordon both had the rank of commander at the time, while Bean was a lieutenant commander. The mission would launch, as scheduled, on November 14, 1969.
- Two civilians were already inside the mobile quarantine van when the astronauts arrived, and would live with the astronauts during the 21-day quarantine. A physician, Dr. William Carpentier, performed diagnostic tests to verify that the three men were not infected, while a mechanical engineer, John Hirasaki, examined the lunar orbiter, which had been placed next to the quarantine container.
- Born:
  - Jennifer Lopez, American singer and actress nicknamed "J.Lo"; in New York City
  - Rick Fox, Canadian actor and former basketball player; in Toronto, Ontario
- Died: Witold Gombrowicz, 64, Polish writer and playwright

== July 25, 1969 (Friday) ==
- A mid-air collision of two commercial airliners was averted at the last moment by a pilot for TWA airlines, preventing the deaths of 199 people. An air traffic controller at the Glasgow Prestwick Airport realized that the two Boeing 707 aircraft were both at 37,000 feet (11,000 m) altitude and were 20 minutes away from colliding, but had been unable to communicate with either airplane because the radio frequencies were at peak use. The controller was able to send out a SELCAL signal to advise both pilots to call Prestwick, but neither was able to do so. BOAC Flight 672, with 143 passengers and 10 crew, was on a flight from Bermuda to London. TWA Flight 830, with 46 on board, was en route from New York to Zurich. Both were at the same altitude and on tracks that would intersect at 5:50 UTC over the North Atlantic Ocean 400 miles (640 km) west-southwest of Ireland. According to reports filed with investigators, the TWA pilot made a steep climb after seeing the BOAC plane, followed by the BOAC pilot banking sharply to the right.
- One week after causing a fatal accident at Chappaquiddick Island, U.S. Senator Edward M. Kennedy went on television to ask his Massachusetts constituents to give him "your advice and opinion" about whether he should resign his office. The three American television networks interrupted their regular programming to broadcast the 12-minute address nationwide. Earlier in the day, Kennedy had pleaded guilty in the Dukes County, Massachusetts court to leaving the scene of an accident and was given a suspended sentence of two months in jail and one year's probation. Most Massachusetts residents sending letters and telegrams would respond that Kennedy should continue in office, which he would do until his death in 2009. Even the mother of the accident victim told reporters that she hoped that Kennedy would stay in the U.S. Senate.
- What would become known as the "Nixon Doctrine" was outlined for the first time in an informal press conference with reporters who had accompanied the U.S. President to Guam during his Asian tour. In remarks later published, but given at the time "for attribution but not direct quotation", Nixon said, "I believe that the time has come when the United States, in our relations with all of our Asian friends, be quite emphatic on two points: One, that we will keep our treaty commitments... but, two, that as far as the problems of internal security are concerned, as far as the problems of military defense... that the United States is going to encourage and has a right to expect that... the responsibility for it taken by, the Asian nations themselves."
- Born: Annastacia Palaszczuk, 39th Premier of Queensland from 2015 to 2023; in Durack, Queensland
- Died: Otto Dix, 77, German artist

== July 26, 1969 (Saturday) ==
- Only the pilot and co-pilot survived the crash of a chartered Air Algerie jet with 30 passengers and a crew of seven that was bringing French oilworkers back to Algeria at the end of their vacation in France. After the Caravelle jet took off from Marseille en route to Biskra, an electrical fire broke out and the pilot attempted an emergency landing at the closest airport, located in Algeria at Hassi Messaoud. The jet crashed into a desert plane at Aïn Naga; the pilot and co-pilot were able to walk away with minor burns.
- A 6.4 magnitude earthquake struck the city of Shantou in China's Guangdong Province. The Communist government of China did not acknowledge the tremor, but the Hong Kong Times, a Chinese-language paper in what was then a British colony, reported that more than 3,000 people were killed.
- Born: Tanni Grey-Thompson, Welsh paralympic racer and gold medalist in four games and one world championship; in Cardiff

== July 27, 1969 (Sunday) ==
- A crowd of 5,000 well-wishers assembled at 1:00 in the morning at the Manned Spacecraft Center in Houston to welcome the Apollo 11 crew back home. Neil Armstrong, Buzz Aldrin and Michael Collins were still sealed inside a quarantine trailer and, an Associated Press writer noted, "could do little more than wave from inside the aluminum jewel box protecting the world from some germ they might be bringing back." The astronauts were, however, able to address the spectators over a loudspeaker connected to the quarantine lab.
- Richard M. Nixon became the first American president to visit Indonesia, the fifth most-populous nation in the world (with 117 million people compared to 203 million in the U.S.), and spent the night in Jakarta during his 22-hour visit.
- Born:
  - Pavel Hapal, Czech football midfielder for the Czechoslovak and Czech Republic teams, later the manager of the Slovakia under-21 national team; in Kroměříž
  - Triple H (ring name for Paul Levesque), American professional wrestler; in Nashua, New Hampshire
  - Jonty Rhodes, South African test cricketer and fielder; in Pietermaritzburg
  - Dacian Cioloș, Prime Minister of Romania from 2015 to 2017; in Zalau
- Died: Gary Hinman, 34, American music teacher who was the first victim of the Manson family murders. After the arrest of gang member Bobby Beausoleil in Hinman's car on August 5, Manson would order a series of similar killings.

== July 28, 1969 (Monday) ==
- President Nixon and First Lady Pat Nixon arrived in Bangkok where they were greeted by the King of Thailand, Bhumibol Adulyadej, and reviewed Thai troops while walking in a monsoon downpour. Nixon then vowed that the United States would "stand proudly with Thailand against those who might threaten it from abroad or from within" even after the end of the Vietnam War.
- Born: Alexis Arquette, American actress and transsexual (d. 2016); as Robert Arquette in Los Angeles
- Died: Frank Loesser, 59, American songwriter, Tony Award, Oscar and Pulitzer Prize winner; of lung cancer. Among the songs he wrote were "Baby, It's Cold Outside"; "Luck Be a Lady Tonight"; and the children's song "Inchworm".

== July 29, 1969 (Tuesday) ==
- In a special election in Greene County, Alabama, African-American candidates won control of both the county commission and the school board of the majority-black, but minority-ruled county. What was described by civil rights advocates as "their greatest election triumph in recent years" made Greene County "the first in the South since reconstruction with both the commission and the school board dominated by Negroes." The election had been ordered by a federal court after the candidates of the new "National Democratic Party of Alabama" had been disqualified from the ballot the previous November. With four of the five county commissioners, and three of the five school board members, "the election gave blacks control of both major governing bodies— a first in Alabama." The date of the vote would later be described as "a watershed for black political empowerment in Alabama."
- Twenty-four people were killed in the city of Mladá Boleslav in Czechoslovakia after the bus they were riding home from work pulled into the path of an oncoming train.

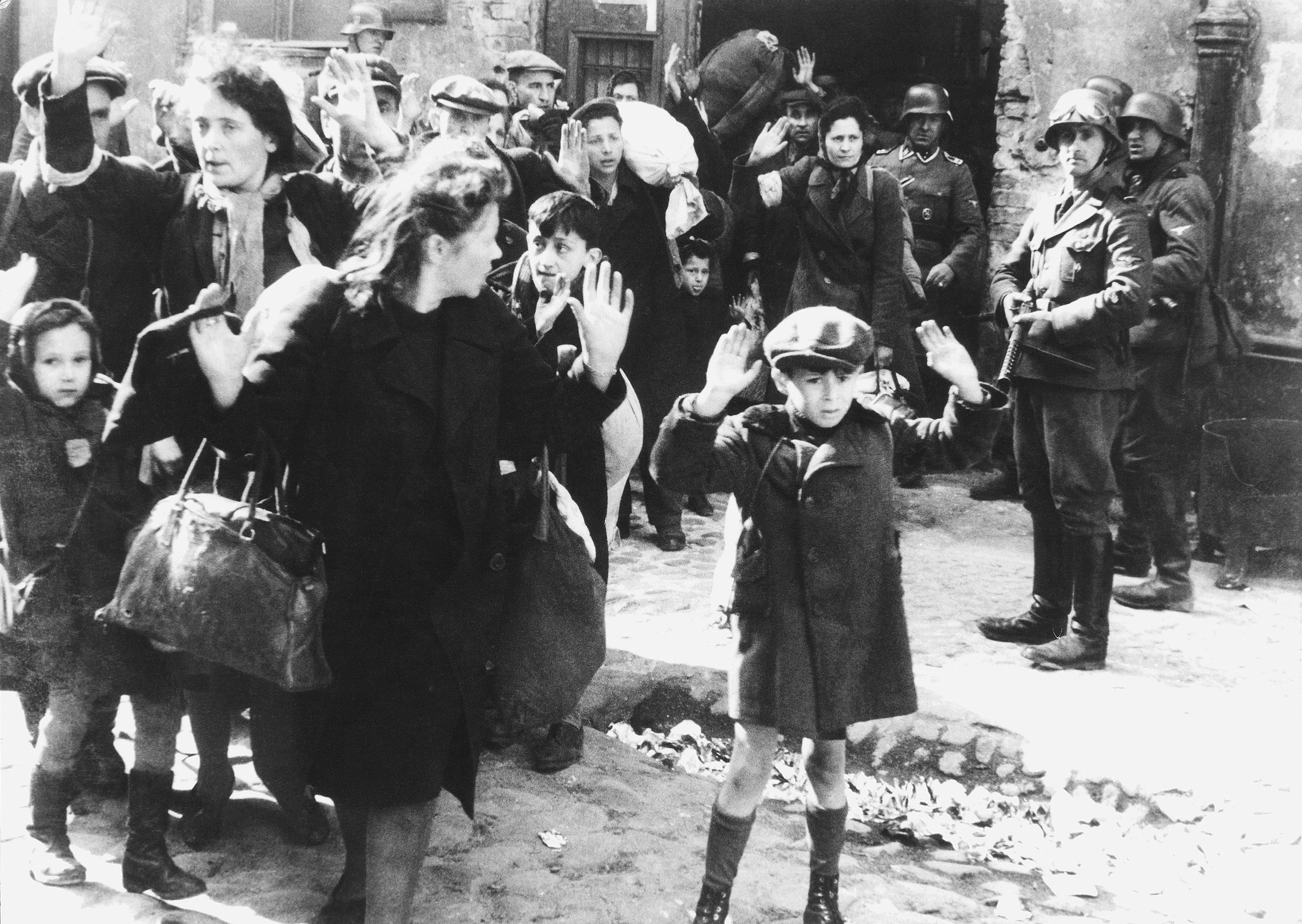
The Blösche photo

- Died: Josef Blösche, 57, Nazi German war criminal, was executed by gunshot at a prison in Leipzig, East Germany, after being identified as the SS officer who led the roundup of Jewish civilians after the 1943 Warsaw Ghetto Uprising. Blösche's image had been seen worldwide in an iconic photograph now called A Jewish boy surrenders in Warsaw, arresting women and children at gunpoint.

== July 30, 1969 (Wednesday) ==
- The U.S. President and Mrs. Nixon made "a secrecy-cloaked one day trip to Vietnam", ending speculation of whether Nixon would make an unscheduled side trip during his tour of Thailand. At noon local time, the Nixons arrived at Tan Son Nhut Air Base near Saigon for "the first visit by an American president to the South Vietnamese capital". Previously U.S. President Johnson had visited the secure U.S. base at Cam Ranh Bay, 180 miles (290 km) from Saigon, in 1966 and 1967.
- Born: Simon Baker, Australian TV and film actor known as the star in The Mentalist; in Launceston, Tasmania

== July 31, 1969 (Thursday) ==
- TWA Flight 79 from Philadelphia to Los Angeles, with 131 people on board, was hijacked by a federal prisoner who was being transported by a United States marshal and by a prison guard who had been assigned to keep him in custody. The two federal employees had not been allowed to bring weapons aboard the Boeing 727, while the prisoner, Lester Ellsworth Perry found a razor blade after being allowed to use the bathroom. After emerging from the bathroom, Perry seized a passing stewardess and held the razor to her neck while ordering the pilot to fly to Havana. Flight 79, which had been west of Tulsa, Oklahoma at the time, then banked south and landed at Havana. Perry, who was already serving a sentence for armed robbery in Connecticut, reportedly "picked up a wrinkled brown bag from his seat" before being greeted by two Cuban soldiers and departed. A few years later, Perry would be released to serve on a Cuban merchant ship, and eventually make his way back to the United States in late 1980. On March 2, 1981, Perry, now 43 and using the alias "Russell E. Fair," would be arrested after attempting to steal a car from a parking lot in South Bend, Indiana and receive two consecutive terms of 25 years in federal prison. The U.S. marshal would be allowed to take disability retirement in September.
- The American Mariner 6 space probe made its closest approach to the planet Mars, coming within 2,130 miles (3,430 km) of the red planet and transmitting higher definition images than had ever been seen on Earth. Among the details never before seen by Earth astronomers was that Mars had smaller craters inside the craters that had been seen previously.
- Elvis Presley returned to live performances for the first time since 1961, starting with his "comeback special" at the International Hotel in Las Vegas. He would go on to break all previous Las Vegas attendance records playing to over 100,000 people in 30 days.
- Pope Paul VI became the first Roman Catholic pontiff to visit Africa, arriving in Kampala, capital of Uganda, where he was welcomed at the Entebbe Airport by Ugandan President Milton Obote.
- Born: Antonio Conte, Italian soccer football midfielder for Juventus and for the national team; in Lecce
