= KVLU =

- Beaumont, Texas; United States
- Broadcast area: southeast Texas
- Frequency: 91.3 MHz

Programming
- Format: Public radio
- Affiliations: NPR

Ownership
- Owner: Lamar University

History
- First air date: April 30, 1974
- Call sign meaning: Voice of Lamar University

Technical information
- Licensing authority: FCC
- Facility ID: 36456
- Class: C2
- ERP: 40,000 Watts
- HAAT: 137 meters
- Transmitter coordinates: 30°06′40″N 94°03′10″W

Links
- Public license information: Public file; LMS
- Webcast: Listen live
- Website: www.kvlu.org

KVLU (91.3 FM), is a public radio station and NPR affiliate broadcasting throughout southeast Texas. It is licensed to Lamar University in Beaumont, Texas with studios located inside the Theater Arts Building on campus on South Martin Luther King Jr. Parkway and a transmitter site located on West Freeway Boulevard South in Vidor, Texas near Rose City. The broadcast area reaches to Jasper, Texas at the north, Lake Charles, Louisiana to the east, Bolivar, Texas to the south and Baytown, Texas to the west. Launched in 1974, the station operates independently and features a diverse 24/7 schedule of programs including NPR news morning, midday and afternoon as well as locally produced music programs, local features and radio documentaries, etc. The station is largely member supported with additional support coming from the university and the Corporation for Public Broadcasting as well as program underwriters.

== Programming ==
=== News ===
The News affiliate of KVLU is National Public Radio (NPR). NPR News programs featured include Morning Edition (morning drive), Here & Now (mid-day), All Things Considered (afternoon drive) and Weekend Edition. Additional news and talk programs include Texas Standard, produced in the studios of KUT in Austin, Think, produced in the studios of KERA in Dallas, Wait, Wait, Don't Tell Me, Travel with Rick Steves and many more.

=== Music ===
KVLU's music programs include Classical mornings, evenings and overnights, Jazz, eclectic afternoons, local music and audience favorites like Hearts of Space (HOS) and World Cafe.

=== Community ===
As a part of the southeast Texas community, KVLU serves as a resource for information connecting listeners with local events, organizations and services. This is achieved through various weekly/daily modular features including Slice of Orange, NFP (Not For Profit), State of the Arts and the KVLU Arts Calendar.

=== Lamar Specific ===
As part of the university's College of Fine Arts and Communication and the Lamar University Media Alliance, KVLU provides training in audio broadcasting and radio production for students interested in pursuing careers in communication. Student interns and practicum students assist with program content contribution and production and can submit pilot shows for broadcast consideration.
