= Kichimatsu Kishi =

Japanese-American businessman

Kichimatsu Kishi (岸 吉松 Kishi Kichimatsu, ?–1956) was a Japanese immigrant to the United States who worked as a farmer and businessman. Along with fellow immigrants from Japan, his impact on rice farming in the southern United States would change the agricultural industry of the region. Kishi would establish an agricultural colony in Southeast Texas and would own an oil company. Born as one of eight children to a Japanese banker, he attended Hitotsubashi University in Tokyo, Japan, but was taken from his studies in 1904 to fight in the Russo-Japanese War.

He was eventually sent to Manchuria on the mainland of China where he remained until the Japanese victory in 1905. He considered remaining there, but the high cost of land and lawlessness prompted him to return to his homeland. Years earlier, Sadatsuchi Uchida (Japan’s consul to the United States) toured the southern United States in 1902. Uchida reported back to Japan with promising news that the rice farming was underdeveloped and showed potential for large profit. At the time, the dense population of Japan and limited workable land meant that many rice farmers would never own their own land. This sparked Kishi’s interest in migrating to the United States in 1906.

== Travel to the United States ==
Kishi looked for suitable land, starting in California and moving on to the Carolinas, and finally discovering the area near the town of Terry in central Orange County, Texas ideal. Located as one of the stops of the Texas and New Orleans Railroad, Terry was a lumber and agricultural town with nearby bayous that could be tapped for irrigation. It was here that Kishi would establish what is now known as the Kishi Colony. He purchased a land tract of approximately 3,500 acres (14 km^{2}) with borrowed money in 1907, and by the following year, his family would reside there with the first rice crop established.

Later, when the Sabine River was dredged for ships nearby, the saltwater of the nearby gulf was allowed to flow into the bayou used to irrigate the rice field, destroying the crop. Kishi then diversified his farm to grow other vegetables such as cotton, corn, and cabbage. The Kishi Colony attracted other Japanese immigrants from states like California that at the time, prohibited people such as Japanese and other foreigners from owning land there.

It was also not uncommon to see people of different heritages such as Mexicans, Cajuns, and African-Americans working within the colony. After the passage of the California Alien Land Law of 1913, many more Japanese would begin to migrate to Texas. Though the Japanese were initially welcomed, hostility arose against their moving in. The Texas Legislature passed a law similar to California's, but many of the Japanese-Texans had enough political influence to weaken it, while still maintaining their land ownership.

== Kishi’s oil business ==
The discovery of oil on the Kishi property in 1919 attracted the interest of Isoroku Yamamoto, who in 1921 was touring the United States oil producing facilities in response to Japan’s growing navy. Yamamoto’s meeting with Kishi would help spark his interest in forming the Orange Petroleum Company. For several years, it seemed Kishi would succeed greatly. He did make enough money to pay back his debtors. During this time Kishi would continue to purchase land. Yamamoto visited the site again in 1924 and found the oil production doing well.

Only several years later, the wells would run dry and the oil venture finally ended in 1925. Afterward, the Great Depression would also have a negative impact on the Kishi colony. Crop disease along with harsh weather destroyed the produce of the farm. In September 1931, Kishi lost his land to foreclosure. His son Taro, who had been working with a Japanese shipping company at the time, helped support his family by buying a small farm near Orange. The Kishi family managed to lease a portion of their former land as well.

Years later, Kichimatsu Kishi was detained by authorities and kept for two months at Camp Kenedy near San Antonio after the Attack on Pearl Harbor, most likely due to his previous contact with Yamamoto. With the influence of the prominent businessmen of Orange such as the Stark and Sims families, he was released back to the community without restriction.

== Family ==
Kichimatsu’s son Taro would become Texas A&M University’s first Asian student. As a highly regarded football player, Taro Kishi helped Texas A&M win a Southwest Conference championship and was one of the early great APA athletes. He graduated in 1926 with a degree in agriculture. Kichimatsu's grandson is the NASA engineer, John Hirasaki, who in 1969 along with Buzz Aldrin, Neil Armstrong, Michael Collins, and William Carpentier – became one of the first five known humans to view lunar rocks inside Earth's atmosphere.

== Markers of recognition and controversy ==
The Texas Historical Commission has constructed a marker on road FM 1135 seven miles (11 km) southeast of Vidor, Texas in recognition of the accomplishments of Kishi and his colony to the region. In this same area, a road that runs through the central part of Orange County was named "Jap Lane" years back, supposedly in honor of the Japanese for the positive impact on the agriculture of the region. However, the word Jap is now considered a racial slur and the road's name has been targeted by civil rights groups. In July 2005, Orange County has changed it to Duncanwoods Lane, Japanese Lane and Cajun Way. In 2007, FM 1135 received a new recognition as "Kishi Road" with a marker.
