= Vidor Independent School District =

School district in Texas, United States

Address
- 1255 North Main Street Vidor, Texas, 77662; United States

District information
- Type: Public
- Grades: PK–12
- Schools: 7
- NCES District ID: 4844160

Students and staff
- Students: 4,311 (2023–2024)
- Teachers: 290.27 (on an FTE basis) (2023–2024)
- Staff: 409.15 (on an FTE basis) (2023–2024)
- Student–teacher ratio: 14.85 (2023–2024)

Other information
- Website: www.vidorisd.org

The Vidor Independent School District is a public school district based in Vidor, Texas, United States. The district serves a 121.38-square-mile (314.4 km^{2}) area in northwestern Orange County, including the cities of Vidor, Rose City, and Pine Forest, and a small portion of far southwestern Jasper County. The Jasper County portion has 16 square miles (41 km^{2}) while the remainder is in Orange County.

In 2009, the school district was rated "recognized" by the Texas Education Agency.

== History ==
The Vidor Rural School District was formed in 1929 through the consolidation of four common school districts – Doty, Magnolia Grove, Pine Forest, and Terry. The Vidor Rural School District became the Vidor Independent School District in 1949.

== Schools ==
- Vidor High School (grades 9–12)
- Vidor Junior High School (grades 7–8)
- Vidor Middle School (grades 5-6)
- Oak Forest Elementary School (prekindergarten-grade 4)
- Pine Forest Elementary School (prekindergarten-grade 4)
- Vidor Elementary School (prekindergarten-grade 4)

Other:

- AIMs Center High School (alternative, grades 9–12)

== Notable alumni ==
- John Hirasaki – NASA engineer, who in 1969 along with Buzz Aldrin, Neil Armstrong, Michael Collins, and William Carpentier, became one of the first five known humans to view lunar rocks inside Earth's atmosphere.
- Tracy Byrd – country music artist
- Dean Corll – serial killer
- Clay Walker – country music artist

== See also ==
- List of school districts in Texas
