= Mobile quarantine facility =

Sealed accommodation for returned Apollo astronauts

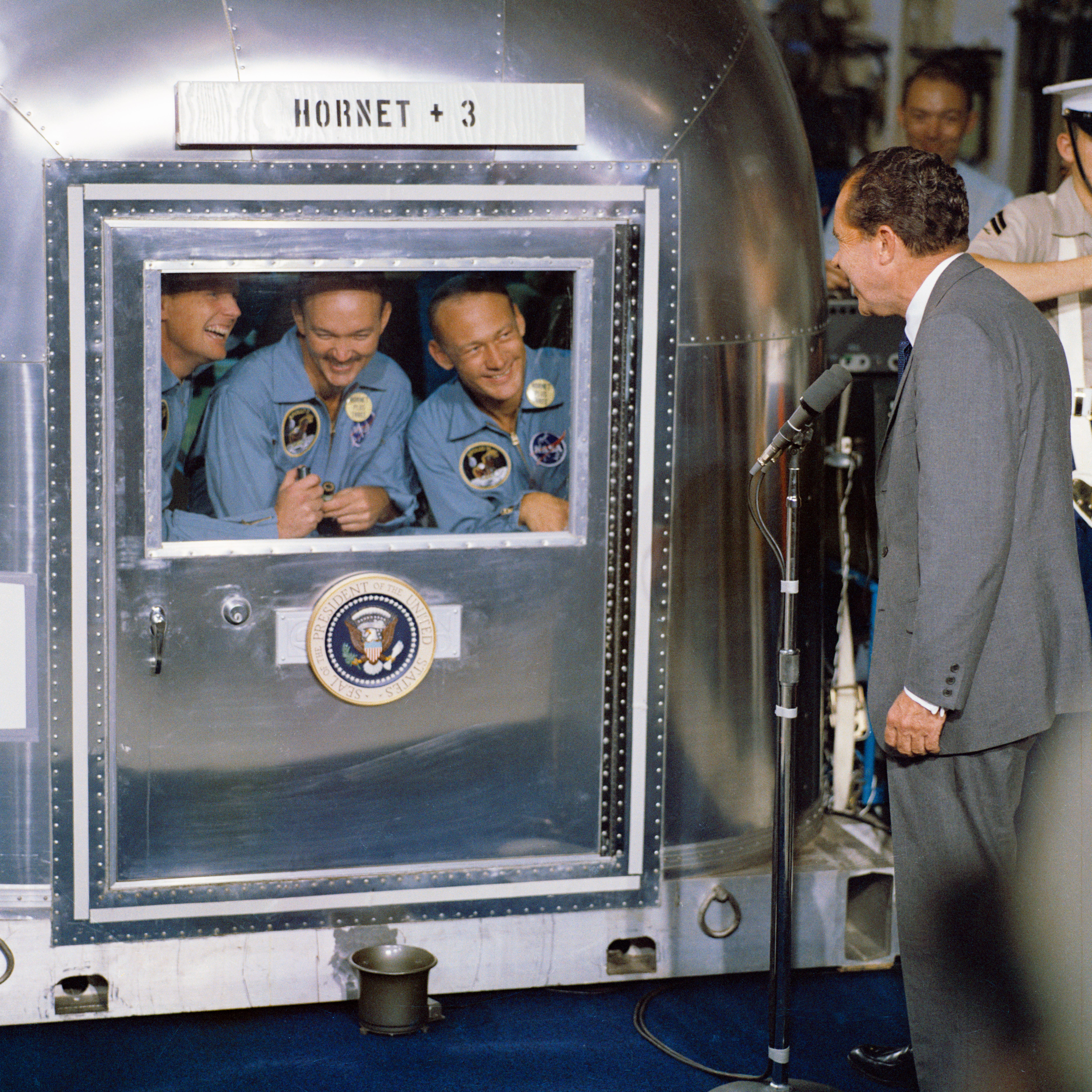
The crew of Apollo 11 in quarantine after returning to Earth in July 1969, visited by President Nixon.

The mobile quarantine facility (MQF) was a converted Airstream trailer used by NASA to quarantine astronauts returning from Apollo lunar missions for the first few days after splashdown. The MQF was on the aircraft carrier that picked up the capsule. Once the aircraft carrier reached port, the MQF was flown to Houston, and the crew spent the remainder of the 21 days of quarantine in the Lunar Receiving Laboratory at the Manned Spacecraft Center. The purpose of the quarantine was to prevent the spread of any contagions from the Moon, though the existence of such contagions was considered unlikely. It functioned by maintaining a lower pressure inside and filtering any air vented.

== History ==
In June of 1967, NASA awarded contract to design and build the four MQF's to Melpar, Inc., of Falls Church, Virginia. Lawrence K. Eliason was the head project manager.

The MQF contained living and sleeping facilities as well as communications equipment which the astronauts used to converse with their families. The Apollo 11 crew also used this equipment to speak with President Nixon, who personally welcomed them back to Earth in July 1969 aboard the recovery ship USS Hornet after splashdown.

The trailers housed the three crew as well as a physician, William Carpentier, and an engineer, John Hirasaki, who ran the MQF and powered down the command module.

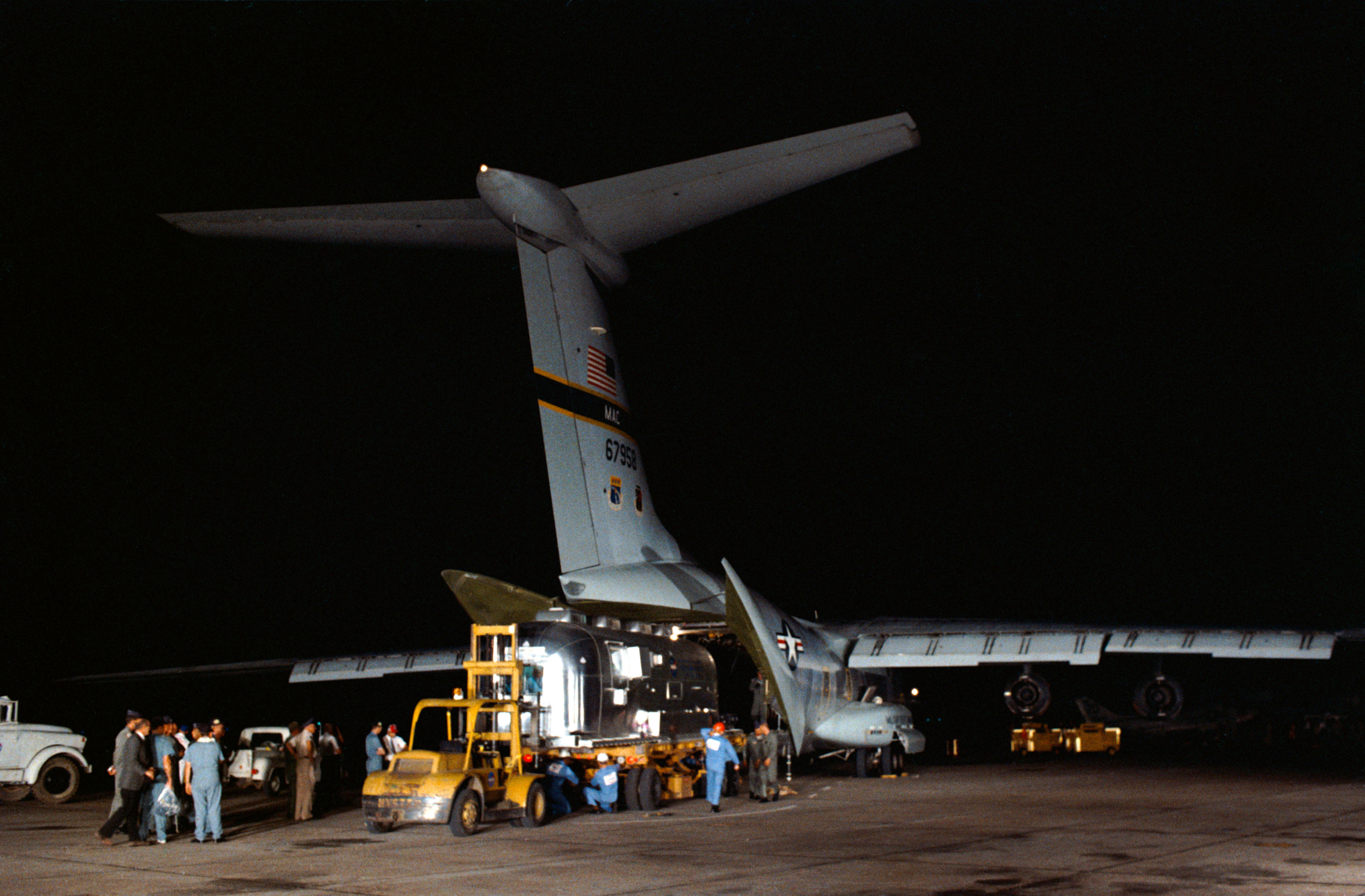
The Apollo 11 mobile quarantine facility, with the crew on board, is unloaded from a C-141 aircraft.

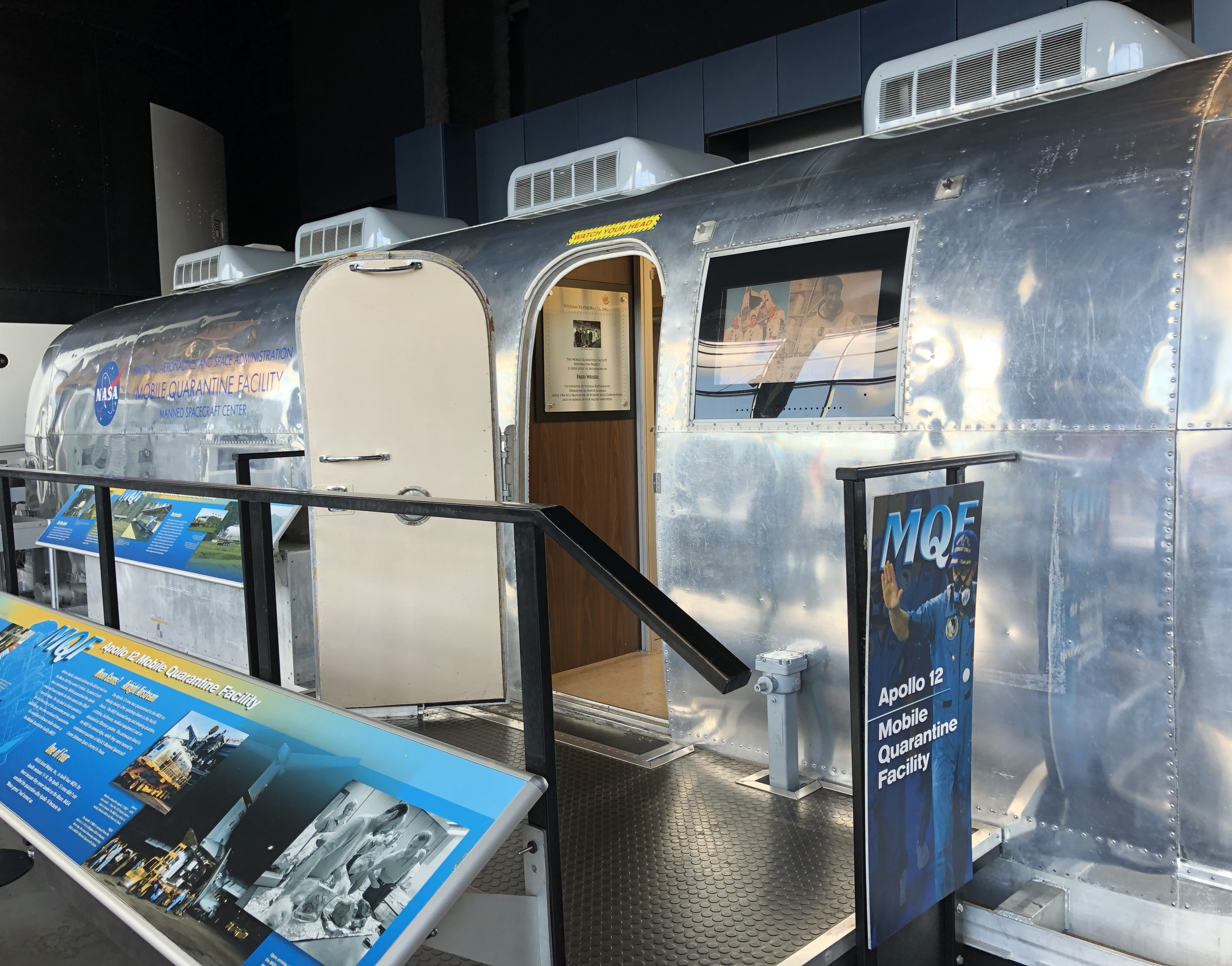
MQF002 Apollo mobile quarantine facility on display at the Huntsville Space museum.

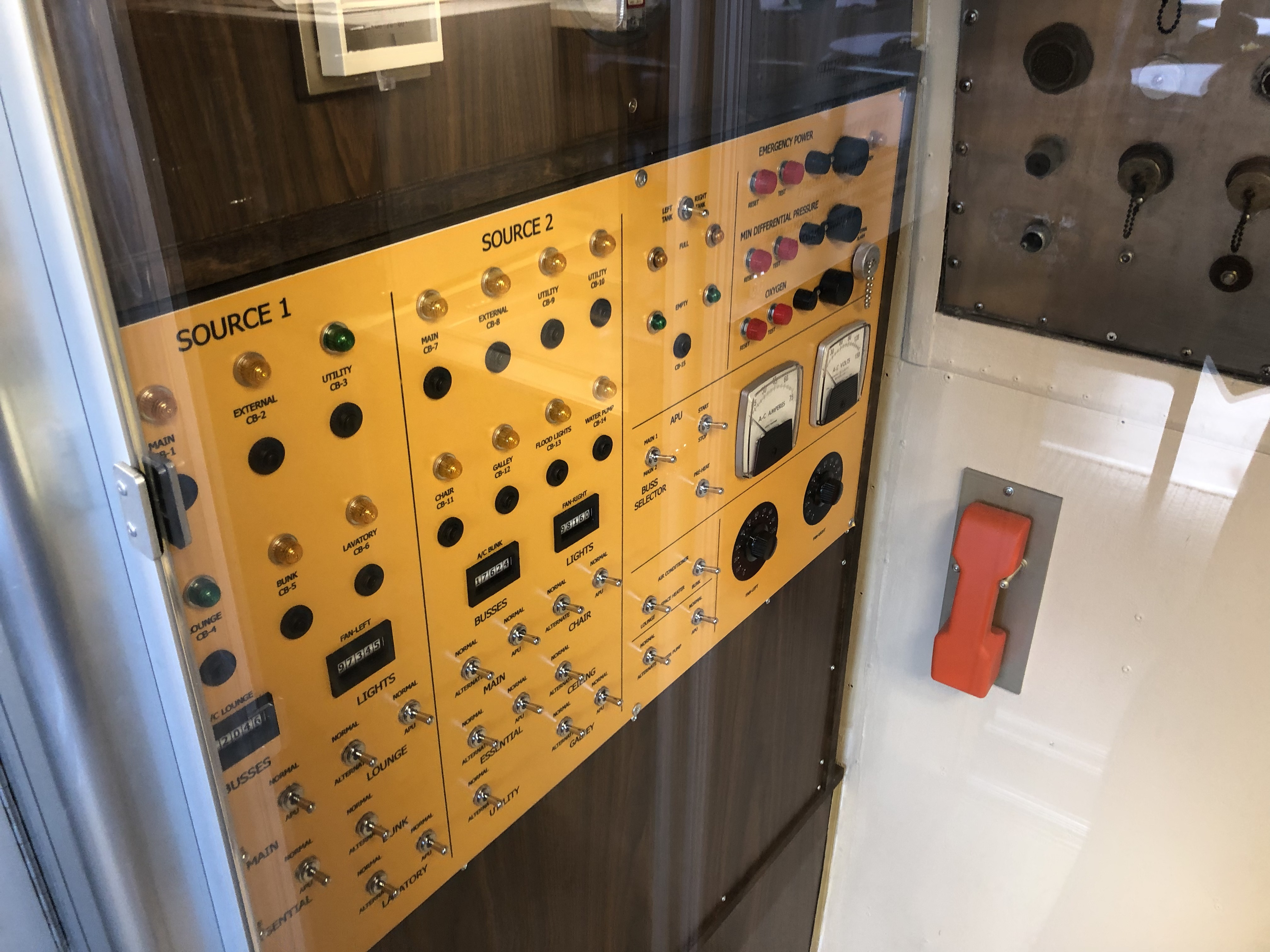
MQF002 Apollo mobile quarantine facility Electricity panel

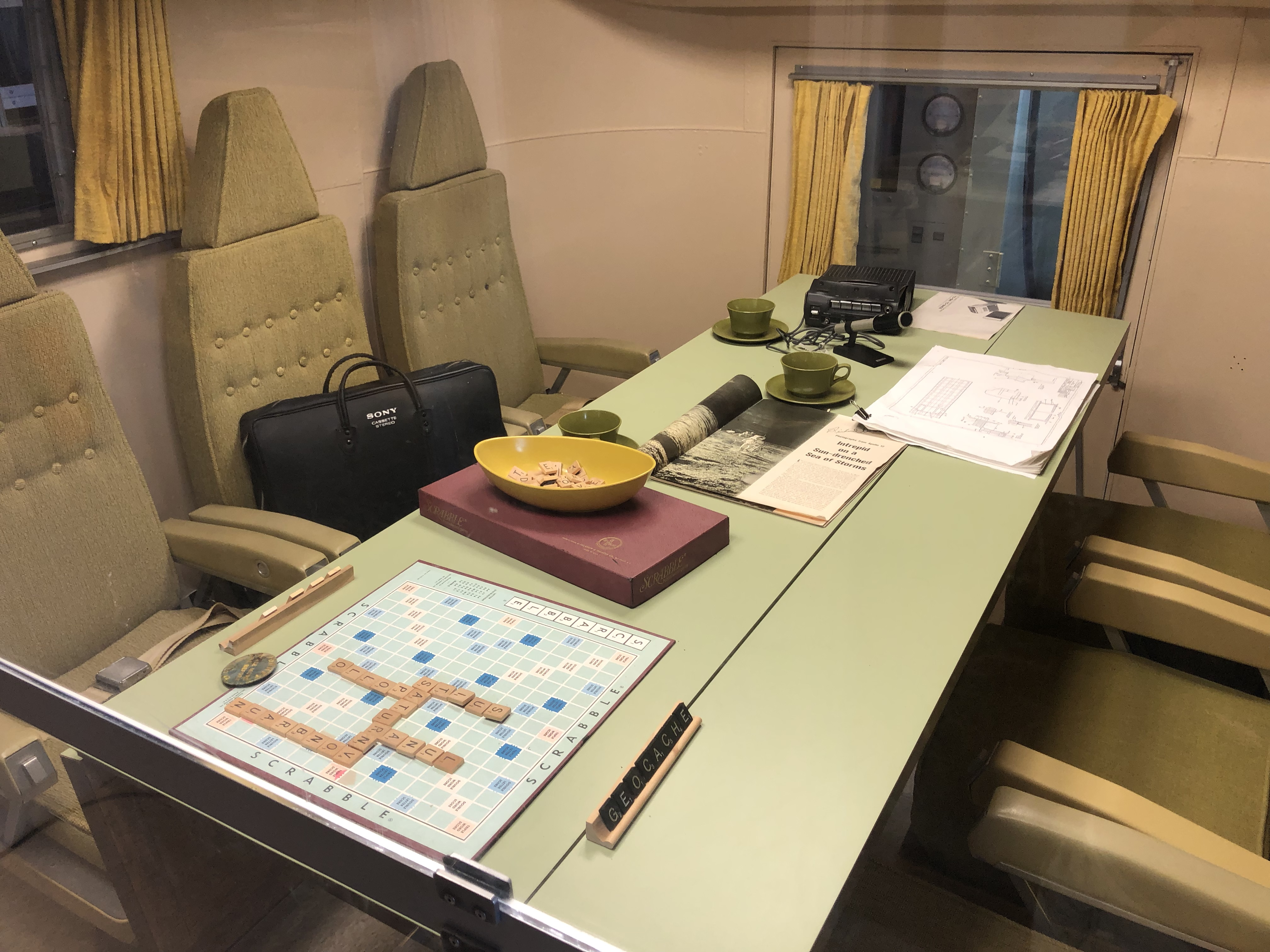
MQF002 Apollo mobile quarantine facility with inside folding table

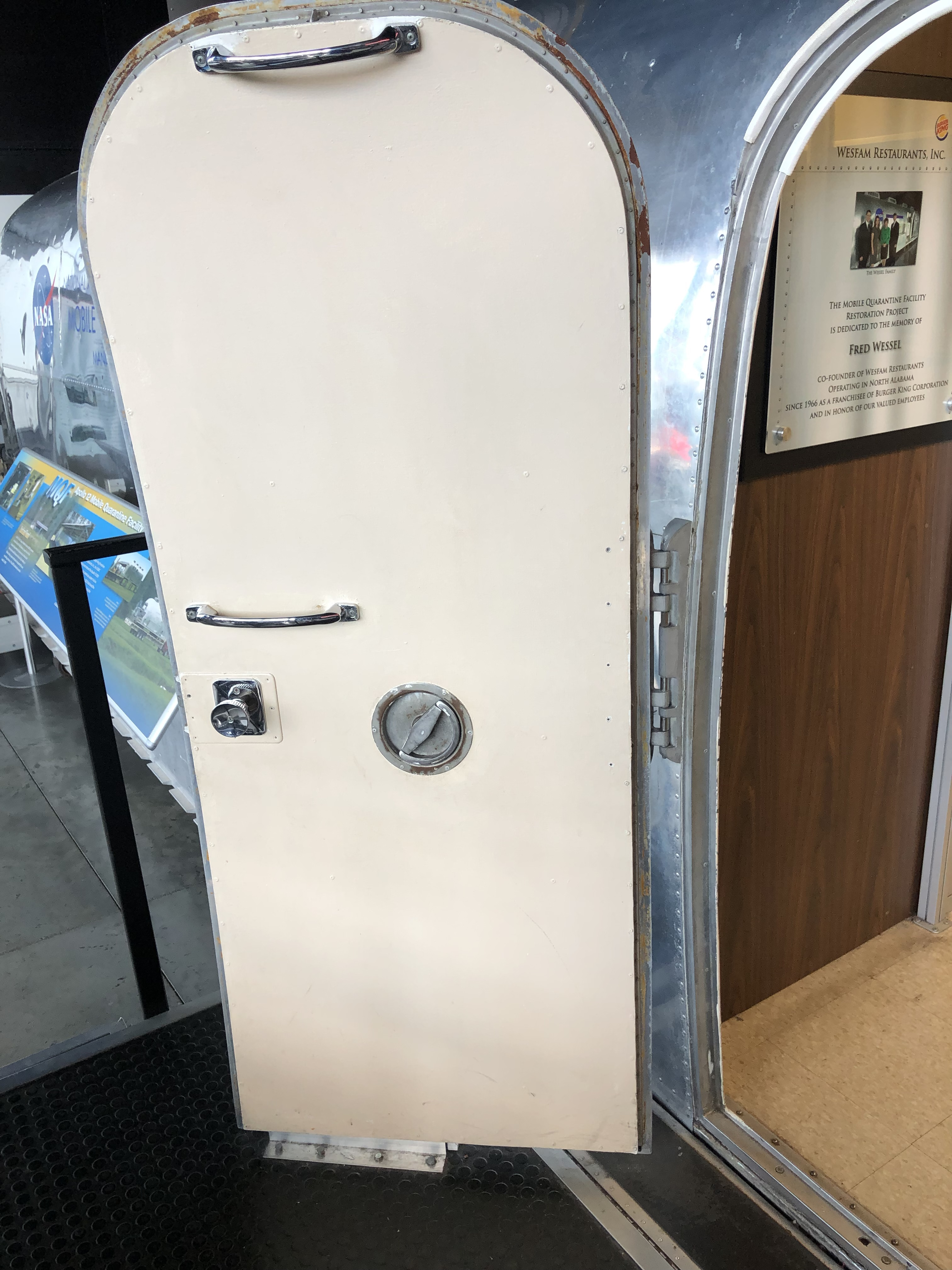
MQF002 Apollo mobile quarantine facility front door seals

Four MQFs were built for NASA:

| Mission | Designation | Disposition |
|---|---|---|
| Apollo 11 | MQF003 | Formerly on display at the U.S. Space & Rocket Center. Currently on display at the National Air and Space Museum's Steven F. Udvar-Hazy Center. |
| Apollo 12 | MQF002 | Converted for various purposes and found near Marion, Alabama. Currently on display at the U.S. Space & Rocket Center. |
| Apollo 13 | MQF001 | Not used for the crew because they did not land on the Moon. For some time the USDA used it. Its present disposition is unknown. |
| Apollo 14 | MQF004 | On display at the USS Hornet Museum in Alameda, California. |

The quarantine requirement was eliminated following Apollo 14 once it was proven the Moon was sterile and that the facilities were therefore unnecessary.

== See also ==
- Crew transport vehicle
