= Vidor, Texas =

- City
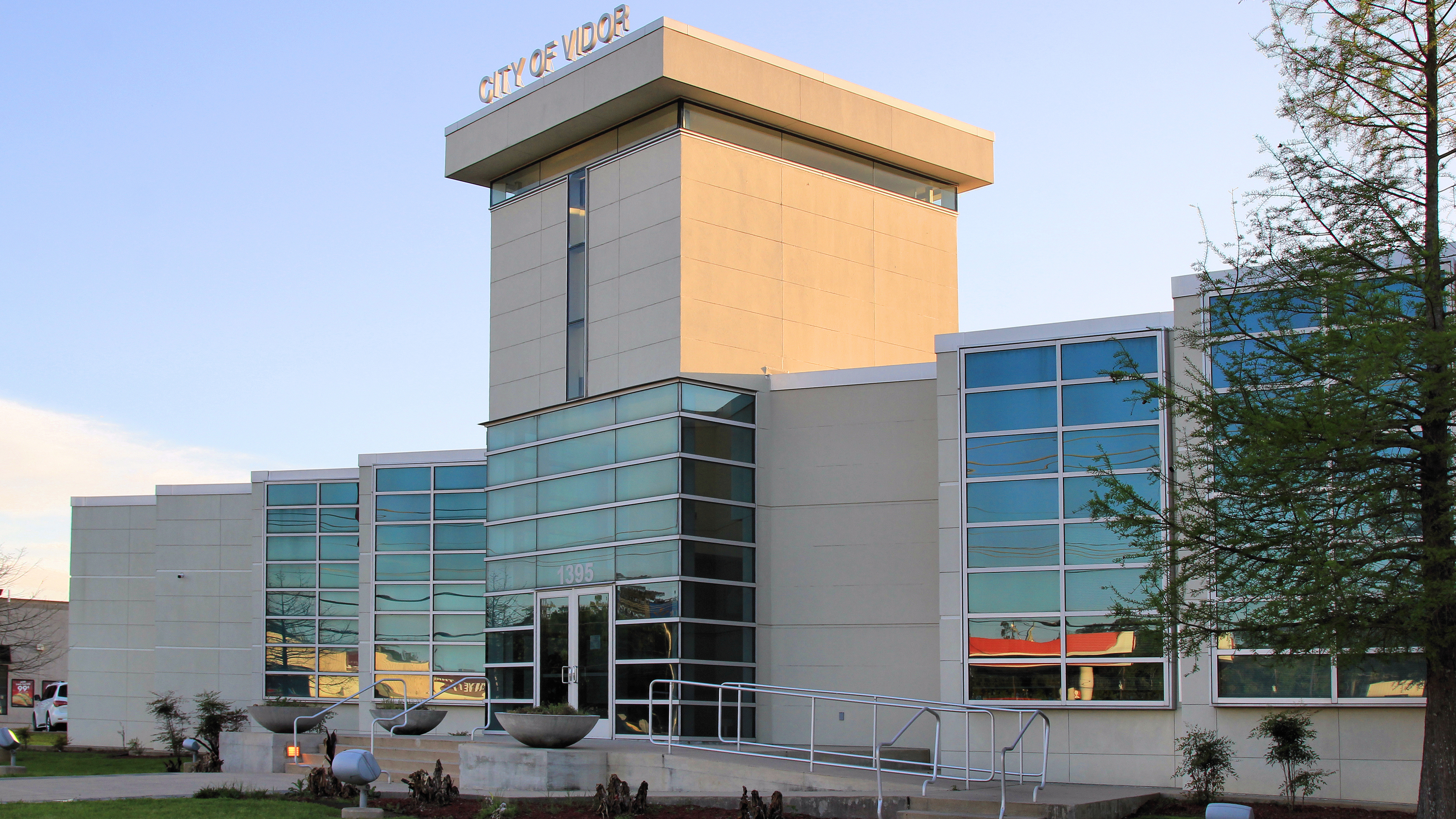
- Vidor City Hall

- Location of Vidor within Orange County, Texas
- Coordinates: 30°07′40″N 93°59′47″W
- Country: United States
- State: Texas
- County: Orange
- Founded: 1898
- Incorporated: 1960

Government
  - Type: Council-manager
  - Mayor: Misty Songe
  - City Council: Mercedes Lee; Nicole McGowan; Michael Thompson; Jessica Barker; MiKayla Borque; Kathryn Weldon

Area
  - Total: 12.118 sq mi (31.385 km^{2})
  - Land: 12.015 sq mi (31.119 km^{2})
  - Water: 0.103 sq mi (0.268 km^{2})
- Elevation: 20 ft (6 m)

Population (2020)
  - Total: 9,789
  - Estimate (2023): 9,738
  - Density: 810.4/sq mi (312.91/km^{2})
- Time zone: UTC−6 (Central (CST))
  - Summer (DST): UTC−5 (CDT)
- ZIP Codes: 77662, 77670
- Area code: 409
- FIPS code: 48-75476
- GNIS feature ID: 2412157
- Sales tax: 8.25%
- Website: cityofvidor.gov

Vidor (/ˈvaɪdər/ VY-dər) is a city in western Orange County, Texas, United States. A city of Southeast Texas, it lies at the intersection of Interstate 10 and Farm to Market Road 105, 6 miles (9.7 km) northeast of Beaumont and Rose City. The town is mainly a bedroom community for the nearby refining complexes in Beaumont and Port Arthur and is part of the Beaumont-Port Arthur metropolitan statistical area. Its population was 9,789 at the 2020 census.

== History ==
The area was heavily logged after the construction of the Texarkana and Fort Smith Railway that was later part of a line that ran from Kansas City to Port Arthur, Texas. The city was named after lumberman Charles Shelton Vidor, owner of the Miller-Vidor Lumber Company and father of director King Vidor. By 1909, the Vidor community had a post office, and four years later, a company tram road was built. Almost all Vidor residents worked for the company. In 1924, the Miller-Vidor Lumber Company moved to Lakeview, just north of Vidor, in search of virgin timber. A small settlement remained, and the Miller-Vidor subdivision was laid out in 1929. Vidor was incorporated in 1960.

Perimeter guard at a Klan Rally in Vidor, 1975

Historically, Vidor has been described as a sundown town, a term used to describe racially homogeneous communities, specifically all-white towns, that have shown hostility to people of other races after sunset. Vidor's segregated public-housing practices were formally abolished in 1993 after U.S. District Judge William Wayne Justice issued an order to desegregate 36 counties in Texas, which included public housing in Vidor. The Ku Klux Klan (KKK) responded by hosting rallies in support of an all-white Vidor, though some citizens protested the anti-black coalition; church leaders held a well-attended prayer rally in opposition to the KKK hatred. After four black families moved into the complex, the residents suffered racial threats, including a bomb threat to the complex. All nine black residents eventually moved out under this pressure. One of the residents, Bill Simpson, was interviewed about his negative experiences while living there. "I've had people who drive by and tell me they're going home to get a rope and come back and hang me. . . ."

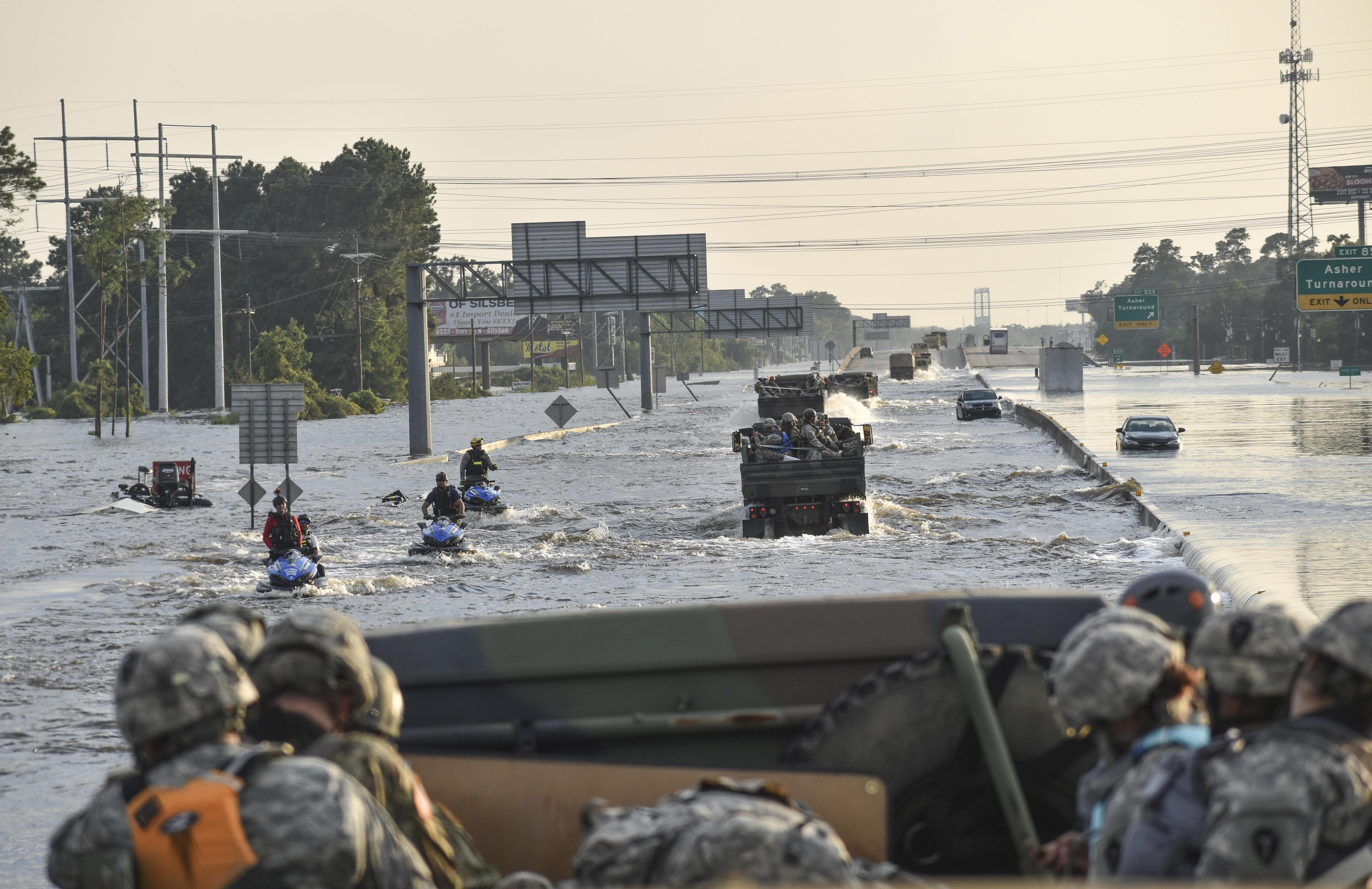
3rd Battalion, 133rd Field Artillery Regiment in Vidor, Texas during Hurricane Harvey

In 2005, 2008, and 2017, Vidor and surrounding areas suffered extensive damage from Hurricanes Rita, Ike, and Harvey, respectively. A mandatory evacuation was imposed upon its residents for about two weeks.

During the George Floyd protests of 2020, Black Lives Matter held a rally in Vidor that was attended by a diverse crowd of 150–200 people.

== Geography ==
According to the United States Census Bureau, the city has an area of 12.118 square miles (31.39 km^{2}), of which 0.103 sq mi (0.27 km^{2}) is covered by water.

== Demographics ==
Historical population
Census	Pop.	Note	%±
1950	2,136		—
1960	4,938		131.2%
1970	9,738		97.2%
1980	11,834		21.5%
1990	10,935		−7.6%
2000	11,440		4.6%
2010	10,579		−7.5%
2020	9,789		−7.5%
2023 (est.)	9,738		−0.5%
U.S. Decennial Census; Texas Almanac: 1850-2000; 2020 Census

=== Racial and ethnic composition ===
Vidor city, Texas – racial and ethnic composition Note: the US Census treats Hispanic/Latino as an ethnic category. This table excludes Latinos from the racial categories and assigns them to a separate category. Hispanics/Latinos may be of any race.
Race / ethnicity (NH = non-Hispanic)	Pop. 2000	Pop. 2010	Pop. 2020	% 2000	% 2010	% 2020
White alone (NH)	10,844	9,796	8,671	94.79%	92.60%	88.58%
Black or African American alone (NH)	8	13	39	0.07%	0.12%	0.40%
Native American or Alaska Native alone (NH)	52	43	47	0.45%	0.41%	0.48%
Asian alone (NH)	22	51	50	0.19%	0.48%	0.51%
Pacific Islander alone (NH)	3	19	0	0.03%	0.18%	0.00%
Other race alone (NH)	2	9	11	0.02%	0.09%	0.11%
Mixed race or multiracial (NH)	110	108	294	0.96%	1.02%	3.00%
Hispanic or Latino (any race)	399	540	677	3.49%	5.10%	6.92%
Total	11,440	10,579	9,789	100.00%	100.00%	100.00%

=== 2020 census ===
As of the 2020 census, 9,789 people, 3,727 households, and 2,531 families were residing in the city. The population density was 814.7 inhabitants per square mile (314.6/km^{2}).

The median age was 39.3 years; 24.0% of residents were under 18 and 17.9% were 65 or older. For every 100 females, there were 94.7 males, and for every 100 females 18 and over, there were 90.6 males 18 and over.

Of the 3,727 households in Vidor, 31.5% had children under 18 living in them, 46.6% were married-couple households, 18.2% were households with a male householder and no spouse or partner present, and 27.7% were households with a female householder and no spouse or partner present. About 25.6% of all households were made up of individuals, and 11.6% had someone living alone who was 65 or older.

The city had 4,405 housing units, of which 15.4% were vacant. The homeowner vacancy rate was 3.1% and the rental vacancy rate was 14.8%.

About 97.8% of residents lived in urban areas, while 2.2% lived in rural areas.

Racial composition as of the 2020 census
Race	Number	Percentage
White	8,972	91.7%
Black or African American	44	0.4%
American Indian and Alaska Native	57	0.6%
Asian	51	0.5%
Native Hawaiian and other Pacific Islander	0	0.0%
Some other race	152	1.6%
Two or more races	513	5.2%
Hispanic or Latino (of any race)	677	6.9%

==== 2022 American Community Survey (ACS) ====
The 2022 ACS accounted for 3,851 households, with an average of 2.50 persons per household. The city's median gross rent was $791 in the 2022 ACS. The median household income was $56,866, and 73.8% of households were owner occupied; 7.9% of the city's population lived at or below the poverty line (down from previous ACS surveys). The city boasts a 59.8% employment rate, with 9.9% of the population holding a bachelor's degree or higher and 87.1% holding a high-school diploma.

The top nine reported ancestries (people were allowed to report up to two ancestries, thus the figures will generally add to more than 100%) were German (18.1%), Irish (12.4%), French (except Basque) (11.3%), English (8.0%), Italian (2.1%), Scottish (0.9%), Norwegian (0.7%), and Polish (0.5%).

The median age in the city was 40.7 years.

=== 2010 census ===
As of the 2010 census, 10,579 people, 3,969 households, and _ families lived in the city. The population density was 902.9 inhabitants per square mile (348.6/km^{2}), in 4,397 housing units. The racial makeup of the city was 95.7% White, 0.1% African American, 0.5% Native American, 0.5% Asian, 0.2% Pacific Islander, 1.5% from some other race, and 1.5% from two or more races. Hispanic or Latino people of any race were 5.1% of the population.

=== 2000 census ===
As of the 2000 census, 11,440 people, 4,222 households, and 3,158 families were residing in the city. The population density was 1,083.6 inhabitants per square mile (418.4/km^{2}). The 4,652 housing units averaged 440.6 per square mile (170.1/km^{2}). The racial makeup of the city was 97.3% White, 0.1% African American, 0.5% Native American, 0.2% Asian, 0.73% from some other race, and 1.21% from two or more races. Hispanic or Latino people of any race were 3.49% of the population.

Of the 4,222 households, 34.7% had children under 18 living with them, 56.3% were married couples living together, 13.4% had a female householder with no husband present, and 25.2% were not families. About 22.0% of all households were made up of individuals, and 10.3% had someone living alone who was 65 or older. The average household size was 2.66, and the average family size was 3.09.

In the city, the age distribution was 26.7% under 18, 9.9% from 18 to 24, 27.4% from 25 to 44, 21.9% from 45 to 64, and 14.1% who were 65 or older. The median age was 35 years. For every 100 females, there were 91.5 males. For every 100 females 18 and over, there were 87.1 males.

The median income in the city for a household was $31,982 and for a family was $37,572. Males had a median income of $35,781 versus $21,054 for females. The per capita income for the city was $15,381. About 10.7% of families and 14.5% of the population were below the poverty line, including 19.5% of those under 18 and 8.9% of those 65 or over.

== Education ==
The City of Vidor is served by the Vidor Independent School District, which is the largest of the six school districts in the county.

== Notable people ==
- Tracy Byrd, country music artist
- Dean Corll, prolific 1970s Houston serial killer
- David Ray Harris, convicted murderer featured in the documentary film, The Thin Blue Line, which features local Vidor law enforcement.
- Tamara Hext, 1984 Miss Texas
- John Hirasaki, NASA mechanical engineer
- George Jones, country music artist
- Roger Mobley, former child actor, was a police detective in Vidor
- David Ozio, Professional Bowlers Association and USBC Hall of Famer
- Don Rollins, songwriter, co-author of "It's Five O'Clock Somewhere"
- Billie Jo Spears, country music artist
- Clay Walker, country music artist

== See also ==
- List of sundown towns in the United States
