= John Hirasaki =

American mechanical engineer (born 1941)

John K. Hirasaki
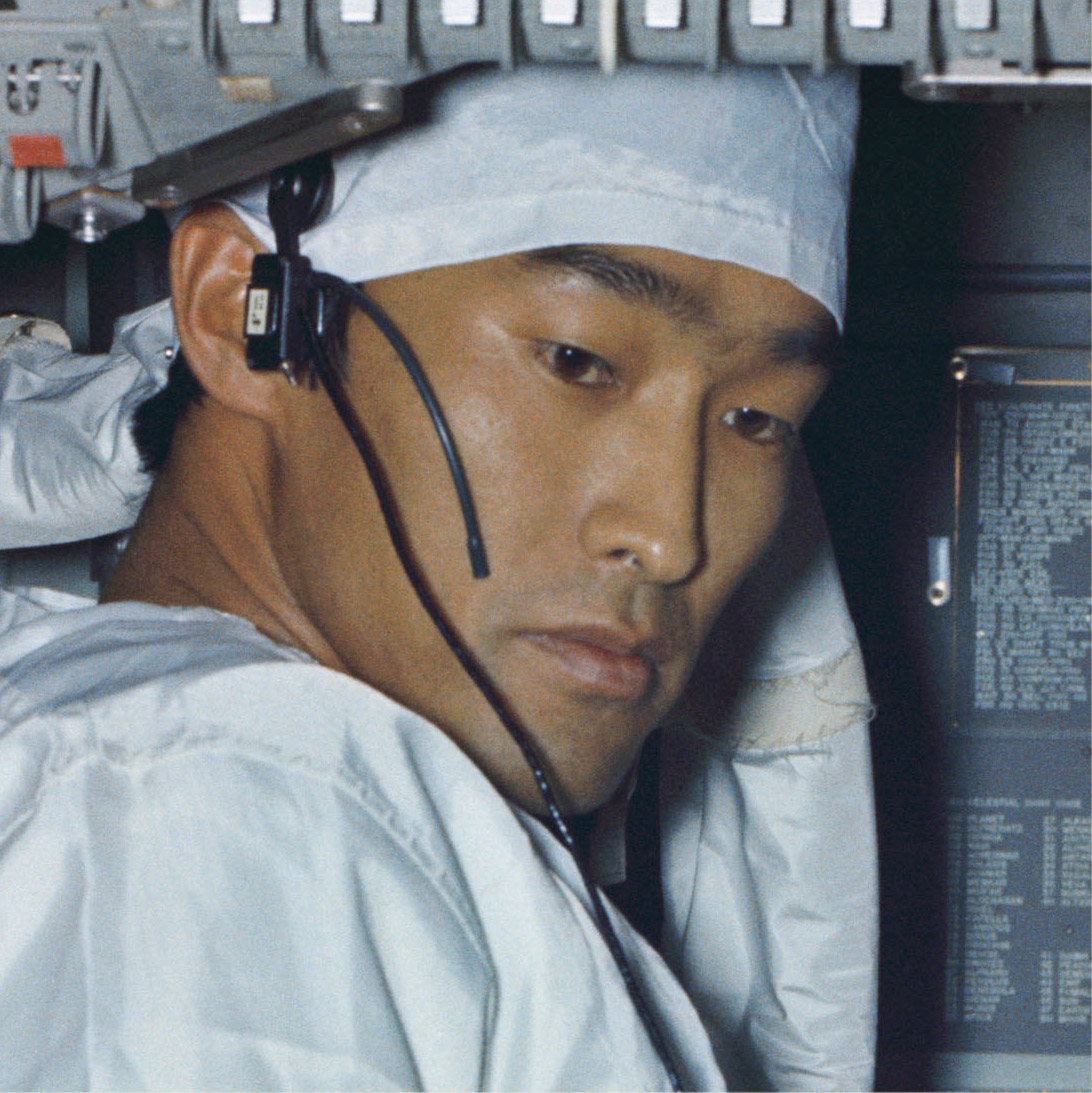
- Hirasaki in 1969
- Born: 1941 (age 84–85); Vidor, Texas, U.S.
- Education: Lamar State College of Technology
- Occupation: Mechanical engineer
- Employer: NASA
- Relatives: Kichimatsu Kishi (grandfather)

John Hirasaki (born 1941) is an American mechanical engineer who worked for the United States' National Aeronautics and Space Administration (NASA) during the Apollo 11 mission, the first crewed mission to the Moon. In 1969 he – along with Buzz Aldrin, Neil Armstrong, Michael Collins, and William Carpentier – became one of the first five known humans to view lunar rocks inside Earth's atmosphere.

== Early life and education ==
Hirasaki was born in Vidor, Texas. He attended Vidor High School and later went on to graduate from Lamar State College of Technology, where he received a Bachelor of Science degree in Mechanical Engineering in 1964.

== Career ==
Hirasaki was hired by the Landing and Recovery Division of the Manned Spacecraft Center of NASA in 1966.

=== Apollo 11 ===
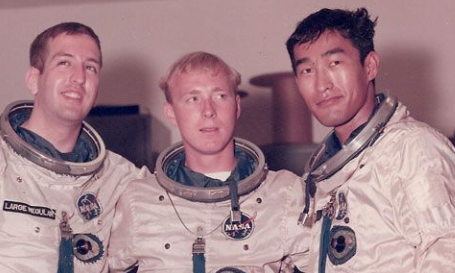
Landing and Recovery Division engineers Frank Janes, Paul Kruppenbacher, and John Hirasaki during water egress tests on October 5, 1966 at Ellington Air Force Base.

The Apollo 11 mission represented the first contact of humans with a non-Earth surface and concern was expressed by the National Academies of Science that the returning astronauts and spacecraft might inadvertently carry extraterrestrial life which could pose a "catastrophic" risk to humankind. Anxiety was exacerbated by the presence of President of the United States Richard Nixon aboard USS Hornet, the United States Navy aircraft carrier tasked with recovery of the astronauts. To address these issues, a Mobile Quarantine Facility (MQF) was installed aboard the ship in which the returning astronauts, as well as flight surgeon William Carpentier, would be isolated. According to Hirasaki, four NASA engineers responded to a call for volunteers for a technician to be present inside the MQF during the quarantine period for necessary maintenance, and to physically remove the lunar rocks that had been recovered by the mission. Prior to the recovery, the engineers drew straws, Hirasaki drawing the short straw. He spent the next three weeks in quarantine with the astronauts and Carpentier. Hirasaki noted that, prior to the mission, he had read the Michael Crichton book The Andromeda Strain; however, he felt the risks to his personal safety were "very, very minimal."

After removing the recovered lunar rocks to the MQF, Hirasaki opened the containment pouch in which they were stored so that he, Buzz Aldrin, Neil Armstrong, Michael Collins, and William Carpentier could look at them, making him one of the first five known human beings in history to view lunar rocks inside the atmosphere of Earth.

In his 1974 autobiography, Carrying the Fire, Michael Collins described Hirasaki as "quiet, flexible, unobtrusive" and said that both he and William Carpentier were "good choices" to join the astronauts in the MQF.

== Personal life ==
Hirasaki's grandfather was the farmer and businessman Kichimatsu Kishi. His uncle, Taro Kishi, was the first Asian-American to attend Texas A&M University and, as a member of that school's football team, the first person of Japanese ancestry to play intercollegiate football in the history of the Southwest Conference.

Hirasaki lived for many years in Dickinson, Texas. As of 2023, he lives in Culver City, California.
