= Rose City, Texas =

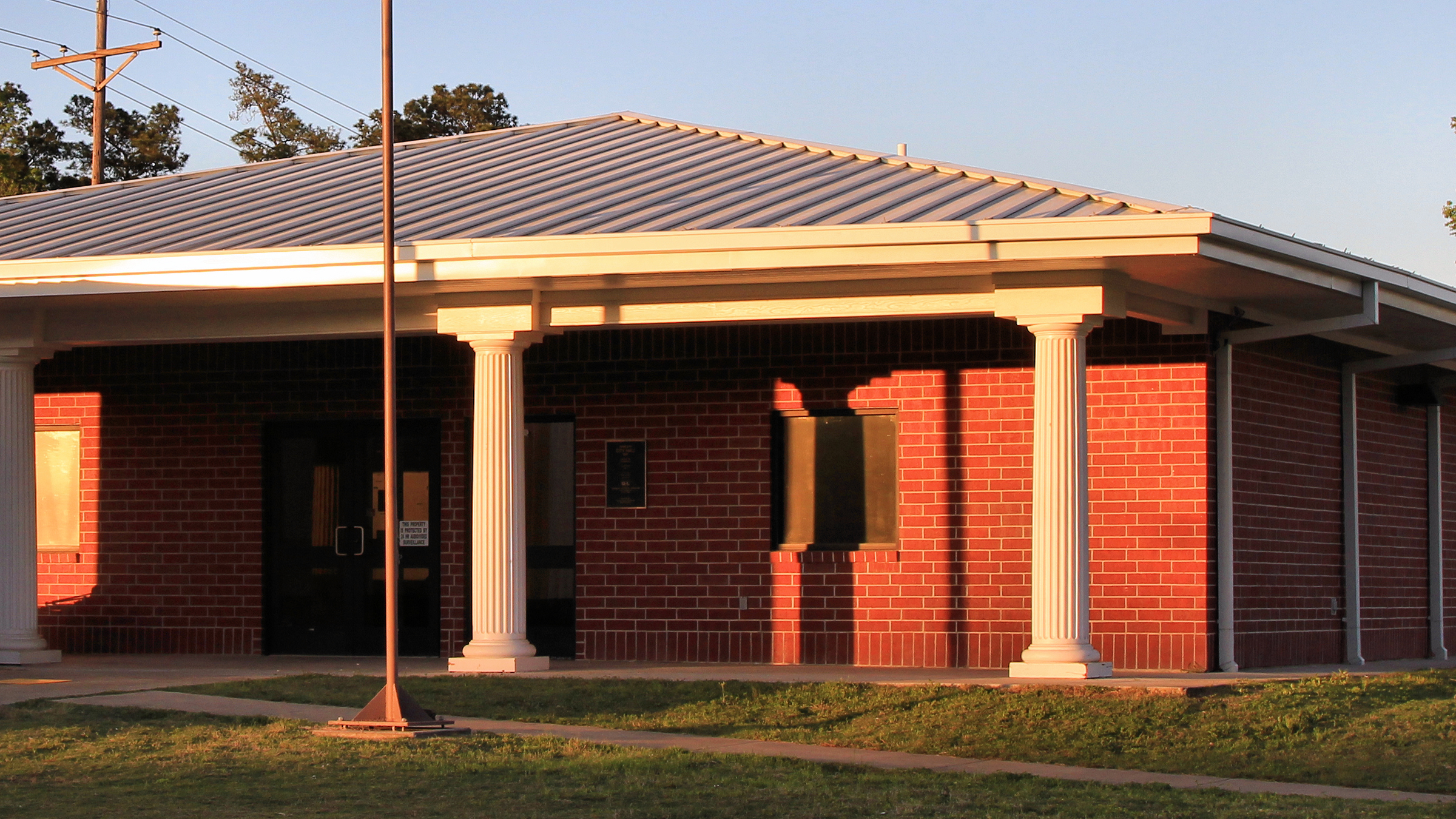
- City Hall

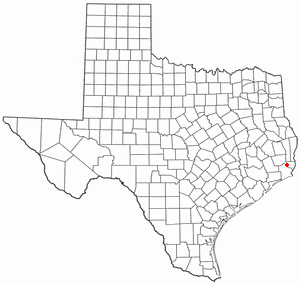
- Location of Rose City, Texas

- Coordinates: 30°06′18″N 94°03′02″W
- Country: United States
- State: Texas
- County: Orange

Area
  - Total: 1.74 sq mi (4.50 km^{2})
  - Land: 1.51 sq mi (3.92 km^{2})
  - Water: 0.23 sq mi (0.59 km^{2})
- Elevation: 3 ft (0.91 m)

Population (2020)
  - Total: 326
  - Density: 215/sq mi (83.2/km^{2})
- Time zone: UTC−6 (Central (CST))
  - Summer (DST): UTC−5 (CDT)
- ZIP Code: 77662
- Area code: 409
- FIPS code: 48-63200
- GNIS feature ID: 2410994
- Website: rosecity.myruralwater.com

Rose City is a town three miles northeast of Beaumont in Orange County, Texas, United States. The population was 326 at the 2020 census, down from 502 at the 2010 census. It is part of the Beaumont–Port Arthur Metropolitan Statistical Area.

== Geography ==
According to the United States Census Bureau, the city has a total area of 1.7 square miles (4.4 km^{2}), all land.

=== Climate ===
The climate in this area is characterized by hot, humid summers and generally mild to cool winters. According to the Köppen Climate Classification system, Rose City has a humid subtropical climate, abbreviated "Cfa" on climate maps.

== History ==
In 1950, an oilfield called Rose Hill was discovered just south of the town plat which yielded large quantities of crude oil and gas. The oil field, along with sand and gravel pits, would provide revenue for the area. In 1973, the town's voters elected to incorporate.

== Demographics ==
Historical population
Census	Pop.	Note	%±
1980	663		—
1990	572		−13.7%
2000	519		−9.3%
2010	502		−3.3%
2020	326		−35.1%
U.S. Decennial Census; 2020 Census

=== 2020 census ===
As of the 2020 census, Rose City had a population of 326. The median age was 46.4 years; 19.3% of residents were under the age of 18 and 21.2% of residents were 65 years of age or older. For every 100 females there were 114.5 males, and for every 100 females age 18 and over there were 102.3 males age 18 and over.

About 80.4% of residents lived in urban areas, while 19.6% lived in rural areas.

There were 148 households in Rose City, of which 31.1% had children under the age of 18 living in them. Of all households, 39.9% were married-couple households, 29.7% were households with a male householder and no spouse or partner present, and 20.9% were households with a female householder and no spouse or partner present. About 33.1% of all households were made up of individuals and 12.9% had someone living alone who was 65 years of age or older.

There were 172 housing units, of which 14.0% were vacant. The homeowner vacancy rate was 0.0% and the rental vacancy rate was 13.8%.

Racial composition as of the 2020 census
Race	Number	Percent
White	263	80.7%
Black or African American	1	0.3%
American Indian and Alaska Native	9	2.8%
Asian	0	0.0%
Native Hawaiian and Other Pacific Islander	0	0.0%
Some other race	35	10.7%
Two or more races	18	5.5%
Hispanic or Latino (of any race)	48	14.7%

=== 2000 census ===
As of the 2000 census, there were 519 people, 190 households, and 126 families residing in the city. The population density was 301.3 inhabitants per square mile (116.3/km^{2}). There were 215 housing units at an average density of 124.8 per square mile (48.2/km^{2}). The racial makeup of the city was 91.52% White, 0.58% Native American, 1.16% Asian, 4.43% from other races, and 2.31% from two or more races. Hispanic or Latino of any race were 10.40% of the population.

There were 190 households, out of which 31.6% had children under the age of 18 living with them, 51.6% were married couples living together, 8.4% had a female householder with no husband present, and 33.2% were non-families. Of all households 23.7% were made up of individuals, and 8.9% had someone living alone who was 65 years of age or older. The average household size was 2.73 and the average family size was 3.32.

In the city, the population was spread out, with 29.3% under the age of 18, 11.6% from 18 to 24, 28.5% from 25 to 44, 19.5% from 45 to 64, and 11.2% who were 65 years of age or older. The median age was 31 years. For every 100 females, there were 101.9 males. For every 100 females age 18 and over, there were 100.5 males.

The median income for a household in the city was $27,344, and the median income for a family was $31,429. Males had a median income of $31,923 versus $16,591 for females. The per capita income for the city was $12,143. About 14.6% of families and 15.1% of the population were below the poverty line, including 17.4% of those under age 18 and 12.5% of those age 65 or over.

== Education ==
Public education in Rose City is provided by the Vidor Independent School District.
