= William Carpentier =

Canadian-American physician

- Born: 1935 or 1936 (age 90–91); Edmonton, Alberta, Canada
- Citizenship: United States
- Education: University of British Columbia
- Occupation: physician / flight surgeon
- Known for: flight surgeon for Apollo 11 and Apollo 13
- Awards: Presidential Medal of Freedom

William Carpentier (born 1935/36, Edmonton, Alberta) is a Canadian-American physician best known as the flight surgeon assigned to the United States' Apollo 11 mission, the first crewed spacecraft to land on the Moon. Carpentier says that this was the highlight of his career. In the months following the Apollo 11 mission, Carpentier became known as a world famous physician. He later went into nuclear medicine research.

Carpentier is a recipient of the Presidential Medal of Freedom, with which he was decorated for his role in the Apollo 13 mission.

== Early life and education ==
William Carpentier was born in Edmonton, Alberta and raised in Lake Cowichan, British Columbia. His mother was Canadian and his father was a Rhode Islander who had to forfeit his United States citizenship during World War II due to his enlistment in the Canadian Army. Carpentier attended Lake Cowichan Secondary School and went on to study at Victoria College. In 1961 he graduated from the University of British Columbia School of Medicine.

According to Carpentier, the achievements of Alan Shepard and Yuri Gagarin piqued his interest in space exploration and, after medical school, he moved to Ohio to pursue additional studies in aviation medicine at Ohio State University.

== Career ==
Carpentier was selected as a flight surgeon trainee by the U.S. National Aeronautics and Space Administration (NASA) in January 1965 and made a staff flight surgeon the following July. According to Carpentier, he attempted to apply for appointment to the Astronaut Corps, but found that as a Canadian he was ineligible to do so. Though he considered renouncing his citizenship, he chose not to after learning the process for naturalization as an American would take several years.

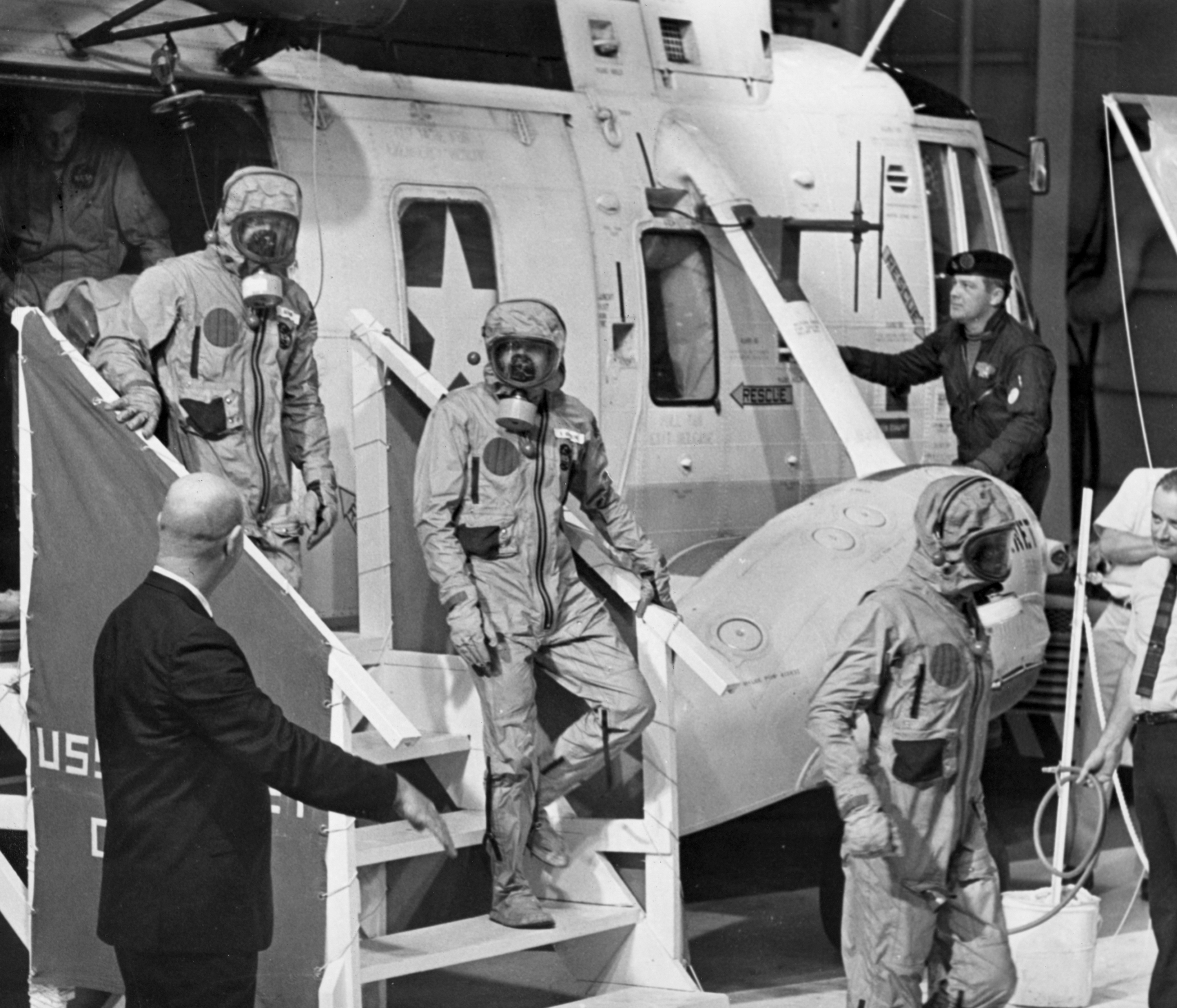
William Carpentier (pictured inside helicopter) follows Armstrong, Collins, and Aldrin as they arrive on the flight deck of USS Hornet following recovery from the Apollo 11 command module Columbia.

He ultimately served as a medical staff member assigned to several Gemini missions and Apollo missions, including as flight surgeon for Apollo 11 and Apollo 13. During the recovery of Apollo 11 astronauts Neil Armstrong, Michael Collins, and Buzz Aldrin from the Pacific Ocean, Carpentier was assigned to Helicopter 66, the primary rescue helicopter which ferried the men to the waiting USS Hornet. Both Carpentier and NASA engineer John Hirasaki – who had come into contact with Moon dust – were confined with the astronauts for their 21-day quarantine. In the period following their release from isolation, the publicity demands on Armstrong, Collins, and Aldrin became so great that Carpentier was sometimes pressed into service to make public appearances in their place after a United States Department of State publicist concluded that the physician "was famous enough". During travel on Air Force One he would be registered by crew into the flight manifest under the initials "WFP" for "world famous physician", a moniker that would stay with him for life.

In 1973, after completing a fellowship in nuclear medicine at Baylor University, Carpentier entered the private sector as a researcher at Texas' Scott & White Healthcare, spending thirty years there before retiring in 2003. Following retirement, Carpentier returned to NASA as a consultant studying the cardiovascular systems of astronauts.

In 2012, Carpentier returned to the former U.S. Navy aircraft carrier USS Hornet – where he had been quarantined with Armstrong, Collins, and Aldrin 43 years before – to participate in a memorial service for the recently deceased Armstrong. (Note: USS Hornet, in 2012, was a museum ship docked in Alameda, California, operating as the USS Hornet Museum.)

== Personal life ==
Carpentier is married. As of 2013 he was living in Belton, Texas.

== Legacy ==
Carpentier was decorated with the Presidential Medal of Freedom for his work on Apollo 13 and, in 2013, received the University of British Columbia Alumni Award of Distinction. A fountain at Lake Cowichan's Central Park is dedicated to Carpentier, as well as a local hockey team named the "Apollos", in honor of his contributions to the Apollo missions.
