= First Man (film) =

2018 film by Damien Chazelle

- Theatrical release poster
- Directed by: Damien Chazelle
- Screenplay by: Josh Singer
- Based on: First Man by James R. Hansen
- Produced by: Wyck Godfrey; Marty Bowen; Isaac Klausner; Damien Chazelle
- Starring: Ryan Gosling; Claire Foy; Jason Clarke; Kyle Chandler; Corey Stoll; Christopher Abbott; Ciarán Hinds
- Cinematography: Linus Sandgren
- Edited by: Tom Cross
- Music by: Justin Hurwitz
- Production companies: Universal Pictures; DreamWorks Pictures; Perfect World Pictures; Temple Hill Entertainment
- Distributed by: Universal Pictures
- Release dates: August 29, 2018 (Venice); October 12, 2018 (United States)
- Running time: 141 minutes
- Country: United States
- Language: English
- Budget: $70 million (gross); $59 million (net)
- Box office: $105.7 million

First Man is a 2018 American biographical drama film directed by Damien Chazelle from a screenplay by Josh Singer, based on James R. Hansen's 2005 book First Man: The Life of Neil A. Armstrong. The film stars Ryan Gosling as Neil Armstrong, alongside Claire Foy, Jason Clarke, Kyle Chandler, Corey Stoll, Christopher Abbott, and Ciarán Hinds, and follows the years leading up to the Apollo 11 mission to the Moon in 1969, exploring the triumphs, and the cost on Armstrong, his family and his colleagues.

The project was originally announced in 2003, with Clint Eastwood slated to direct. After that rendition fell through, Chazelle, Gosling and Singer all signed on by 2015, and principal photography began in Atlanta in November 2017.

First Man had its premiere at the Venice Film Festival on August 29, 2018, and was released in the United States on October 12, by Universal Pictures. The film received critical acclaim, particularly regarding the direction, Gosling and Foy's performances, musical score, and the Moon landing sequence, but it underperformed at the box office, grossing $105.7 million worldwide against $59 million production budget. It received numerous accolades, including four nominations at the 91st Academy Awards (winning Best Visual Effects).

== Plot ==
In 1961, NASA test pilot Neil Armstrong is flying the X-15 rocket-powered spaceplane when it unexpectedly bounces off the atmosphere when Armstrong attempts his initial descent. Although he manages to land the plane in the Mojave Desert, his colleagues express concern that his recent record of mishaps is due to distraction. His 2-year-old daughter, Karen, is undergoing treatment for a brain tumor. Desperate to save her, Neil keeps a detailed log of her symptoms and researches possible treatments, but she dies soon afterward. Grief-stricken and suspecting he has been grounded, Armstrong applies for Project Gemini and is accepted to NASA Astronaut Group 2. With his wife Janet, and their son Rick, Neil moves to Houston alongside other astronaut families. He befriends Elliot See, another civilian test pilot, and Ed White. As Armstrong begins training, Deke Slayton impresses upon the new astronauts the importance of the Gemini program, as the Soviet Union had reached every milestone in the Space Race ahead of the United States. Neil and Janet have a second son, Mark.

In 1965, after the Soviets complete the first extravehicular activity (EVA), Armstrong is informed that he will command Gemini 8, with David Scott as the pilot. Prior to the mission, See and Charles Bassett are killed in a T-38 crash, deepening Armstrong's grief at the string of recent losses. Armstrong and Scott successfully launch on Gemini 8 and dock with the Agena target vehicle, but soon afterward, a malfunction causes the spacecraft to roll at an increasingly dangerous rate. After nearly blacking out, Armstrong activates the RCS thrusters and safely aborts the mission. He initially faces criticism, but NASA determines the crew is not at fault and the mission is rated a "success".

Later, White reveals that he has been selected for the Apollo 1 mission, along with Gus Grissom and Roger Chaffee. During a launch rehearsal test on January 27, 1967, a fire kills White and the Apollo 1 crew; Armstrong learns the news while representing NASA at the White House. The next year, after Armstrong ejects from the Lunar Landing Research Vehicle in an accident that nearly kills him, Slayton informs Armstrong that he has been selected to command Apollo 11, which will likely attempt the first lunar landing. As the mission nears, Armstrong becomes increasingly preoccupied and emotionally distant from his family. Prior to the launch, Janet confronts Neil about the possibility that he might not survive the flight and insists that he explain the risks of the mission to their young sons. After telling them about the risks he faces, Armstrong says goodbye to his family.

Three days after launch, Apollo 11 enters lunar orbit. Armstrong and Buzz Aldrin undock in the Lunar Module Eagle and begin the landing. The landing site terrain turns out to be much rougher than expected, forcing Armstrong to take manual control of the spacecraft. He lands Eagle successfully at an alternative site with less than 30 seconds of fuel remaining. As he sets his foot on the Moon, Armstrong utters, "That's one small step for man, one giant leap for mankind." Later, he drops Karen's bracelet into Little West crater. The astronauts return home and are placed in quarantine, where they watch footage of John F. Kennedy's 1962 speech "We choose to go to the Moon" on television, and Neil and Janet share a moment of tenderness.

== Cast ==
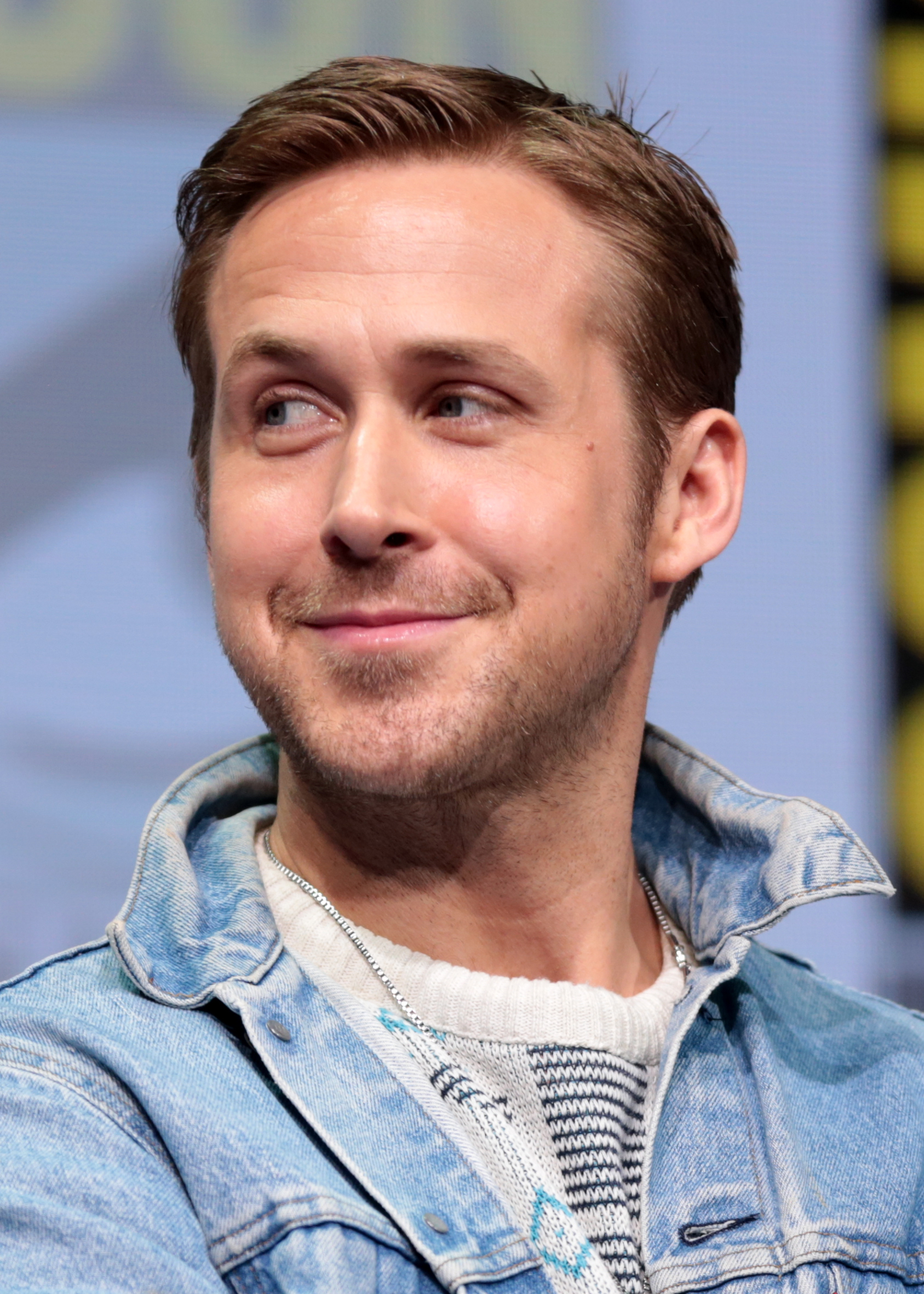
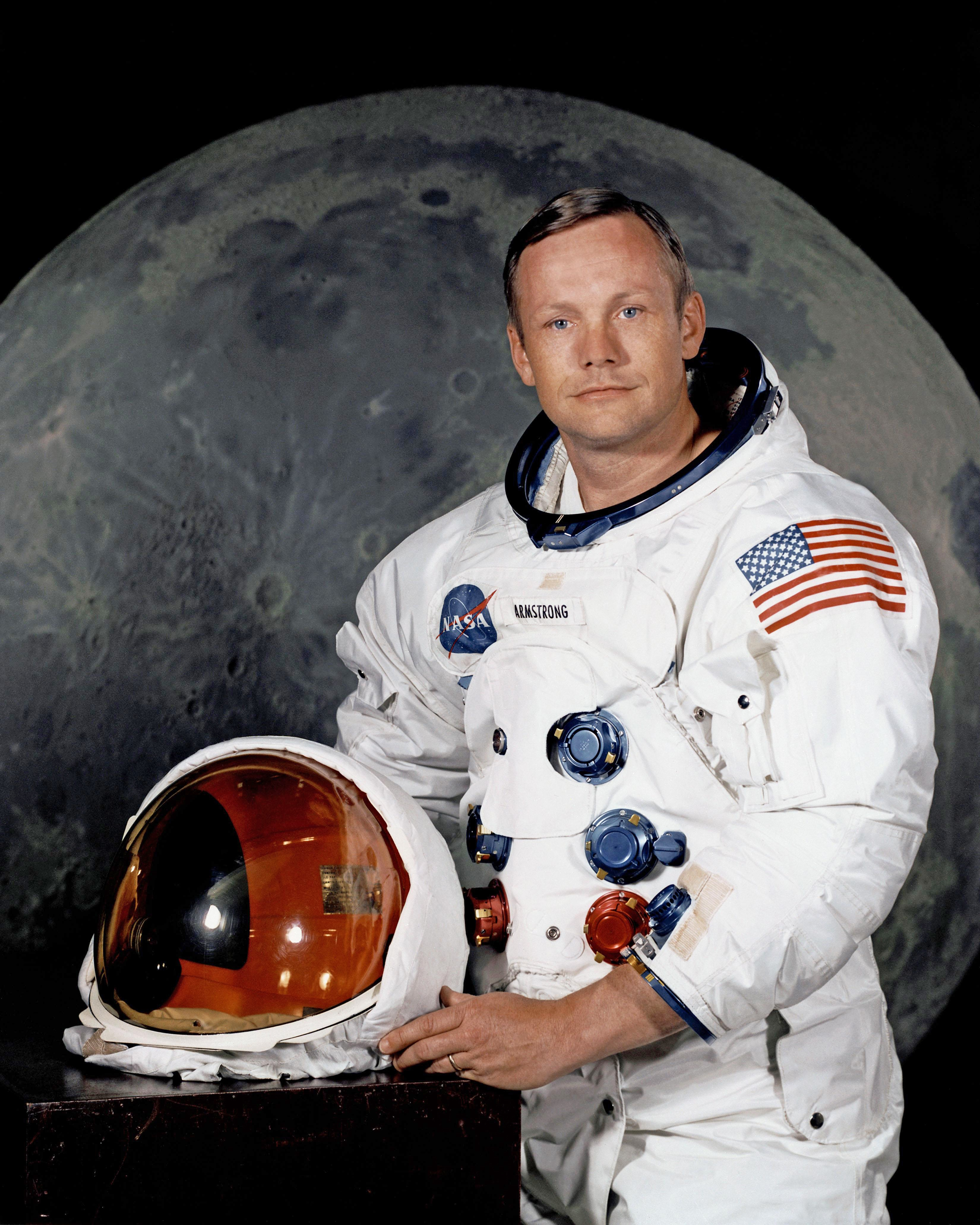
Ryan Gosling (left) portrays Neil Armstrong
- Ryan Gosling as Neil Armstrong, the astronaut who will become the first man to walk on the Moon during Apollo 11.
- Claire Foy as Janet Armstrong, Neil's first wife.
- Jason Clarke as Ed White, Neil's friend and neighbor, the first American to walk in space, who died during a pre-launch test for Apollo 1, which was to be the first crewed Apollo mission.
- Kyle Chandler as Deke Slayton, one of the original Mercury Seven astronauts, who became NASA's first Chief of the Astronaut Office.
- Corey Stoll as Buzz Aldrin, the second man to walk on the Moon during Apollo 11, and also pilot for Gemini 12.
- Patrick Fugit as Elliot See, partnered with Armstrong as backup crew for Gemini 5. Chosen for command on Gemini 9, See was killed in 1966 when his NASA trainer jet crashed in St. Louis, where he was training for that mission.
- Christopher Abbott as Dave Scott, who flew with Armstrong on the Gemini 8 mission.
- Ciarán Hinds as Bob Gilruth, the first director of NASA's Manned Spacecraft Center.
- Olivia Hamilton as Pat White, Ed's wife.
- Pablo Schreiber as Jim Lovell, Gemini astronaut and backup commander on Armstrong's Apollo 11 mission.
- Shea Whigham as Gus Grissom, one of the original Mercury Seven astronauts. He was killed during a pre-launch test for Apollo 1, which was to be the first crewed Apollo mission.
- Shawn Eric Jones as Wally Schirra, the first astronaut to go into space three times, and the only astronaut to have flown in the Mercury, Gemini, and Apollo programs.
- Lukas Haas as Mike Collins, the Command Module Pilot for Apollo 11, who also flew on Gemini 10.
- Ethan Embry as Pete Conrad, Pilot of Gemini 5 and backup commander for Gemini 8.
- Brian d'Arcy James as Joe Walker, Armstrong's fellow X-15 test pilot who became the seventh person in space by taking that plane into space twice.
- Cory Michael Smith as Roger Chaffee, capsule communicator for the Gemini 3 and Gemini 4 missions, and the third crew member who was killed with Grissom and White in the Apollo 1 pre-launch test.
- Kris Swanberg as Marilyn See, Elliot's wife.
- Skyler Bible as Richard F. Gordon Jr., astronaut, the backup pilot for Neil Armstrong during the Gemini 8 mission.
- Gavin Warren as Rick Armstrong, Neil Armstrong's son.
- Leon Bridges as Gil Scott-Heron

Cast notes:

- Paul Haney is portrayed by Mark Armstrong, Neil's son. Rick Armstrong, Mark's brother, is also in Mission Control, seated to Mark's right. Andrew Armstrong, Mark's son, also portrays the flight controller who is playing guitar after Gemini 8 docks in space.

== Production ==
=== Development ===
In early 2003, actor-director Clint Eastwood and production people at the Warner Bros. studio bought the film rights to James R. Hansen's First Man: The Life of Neil A. Armstrong. Eastwood had previously directed as well as starred in the 2000 space-themed picture Space Cowboys, though he stated that he would likely not appear on camera in First Man.

Universal and DreamWorks ultimately took up the First Man project in the mid-2010s. Damien Chazelle, who had received critical acclaim for his work on 2014's Whiplash, signed on to the film's production that year, and hired Josh Singer to rewrite an existing script. Gosling, who starred in Chazelle's 2016 film La La Land, joined as well to portray Armstrong in November 2015, and Hansen was hired to co-produce the film because of his role as the book's author. Wyck Godfrey and Marty Bowen also produced the film through Temple Hill Entertainment, with pre-production starting in March 2017. Actor Jon Bernthal was originally attached to the project and was cast as David Scott, but had to depart the production when his daughter suffered a serious illness. PIX Systems were used to aid in the production of this film.

=== Filming ===
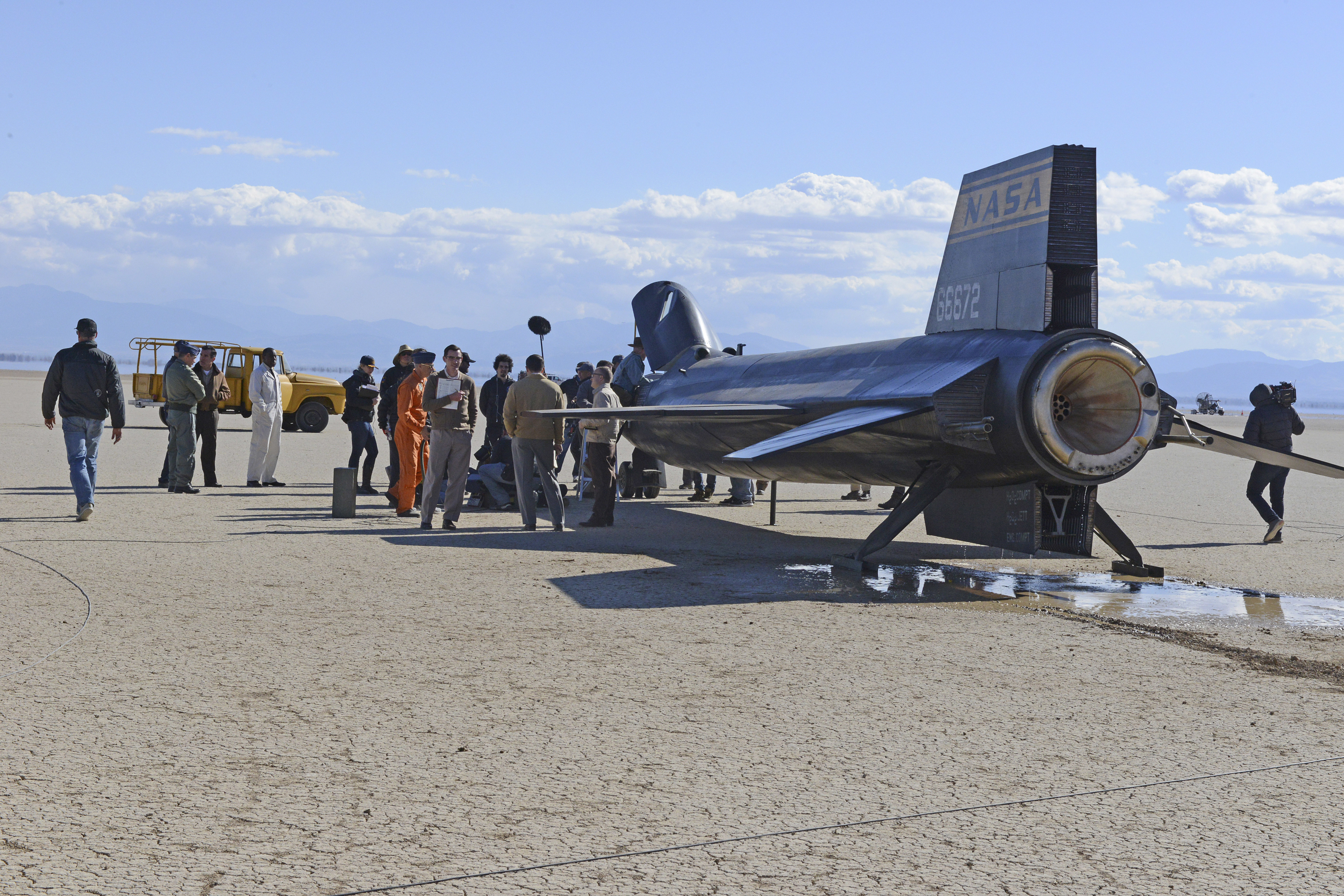
Mockup of X-15-3 on set at Edwards Air Force Base

Principal photography began in Atlanta, Georgia, in November 2017. Chazelle and cinematographer Linus Sandgren chose to shoot the film in four different formats: Super 16mm, 35mm Techniscope & Super 35 3-perf, and IMAX 70mm film for the Moon sequence. The 16mm format was used in most of the scenes that occur inside the spacecraft and 35mm film was used for the scenes that take place in the Armstrong house and around the NASA facility.

First Man was shot without the use of green screen. Instead, LED displays of up to 10 meters were used. These projected images that would simulate views of the Earth, space and lunar surface as seen from inside (or just outside) aircraft and spacecraft depicted in the film. Next to the screens, several simulators of spacecraft were built. These were programmed to move synchronized with the images on the curved LED screens that could be seen through the windows. Chazelle chose this technique to help the actors to feel like the astronauts; instead of seeing a green screen, they saw the outside environment recreated with visual effects. Miniatures were used for several exterior shots of the spacecraft.

To recreate Armstrong's home, the production crew built a replica of it in an empty lot. The lunar surface was simulated by sculpting the landscape of the Vulcan Quarry just south of Atlanta. Chazelle filmed these sequences at night, using a custom 200,000-watt light to duplicate the effect of sunlight on the surface. For the simulation of low gravity on the lunar surface, a balancing system calibrated for the actors was constructed. NASA historian Christian Gelzer, as well as astronauts Al Bean (from Apollo 12) and Al Worden (from Apollo 15), were on set as technical consultants.

=== Visual effects ===
Paul Lambert served as the main visual effects supervisor. Visual effects for the film were provided by DNEG. To create the images that would be displayed on the LED screens, Terragen, a scenery generation program, was used. Additionally, archival footage such as that of an Apollo launch was used, found by DNEG in a 70mm military stock that had not been seen before. These shots were then cleaned up and extended on each side of the frame. Chazelle believed that it was important that the space scenes in the film matched what people knew from the historical footage, and using the historical footage itself made this possible.

=== Costumes ===
The pressure suits used in the film were made by prop maker Ryan Nagata. His work on the film includes the A/P22S-2 worn in the beginning of the movie, the ejection seat harness on the Gemini suits, and the gloves used on the Lunar Extra Vehicular Activity (EVA) scene along with the Communications Carrier Assembly or "Snoopy cap", and a urine collection device. The Gemini, Apollo I, and Apollo A7L suits were made by Global Effects Inc, and were used throughout the section of the movie devoted to Apollo 11.

== Soundtrack ==
The musical score for First Man was composed and conducted by Justin Hurwitz. The score was performed by a 94-piece orchestra, with instruments such as the electronic theremin and Moog synthesizer, as well as vintage sound-altering machines including Leslie speakers and an Echoplex, in order to balance vintage and electronic sounds. The score album released on October 12, 2018, by Back Lot Music and received praise from critics, especially for its balance of softer melodic passages and powerful themes.

== Release ==
The film had its world premiere at the Venice Film Festival on August 29, 2018. It screened at the Telluride Film Festival on August 31, 2018, and at the Toronto International Film Festival in IMAX at the Ontario Place Cinesphere on September 9, 2018. It was theatrically released in the United States on October 12, 2018, by Universal Pictures.

== Reception ==
=== Box office ===
First Man grossed $44.9 million in the United States and Canada, and $60.7 million in other territories, for a total worldwide gross of $105.6 million, against a production budget of $59 million.

In the United States and Canada, First Man was released alongside Goosebumps 2: Haunted Halloween and Bad Times at the El Royale, and was projected to gross $18–25 million from 3,640 theaters in its opening weekend. The film made $5.8 million on its first day, including $1.1 million from Thursday night previews at 2,850 theaters. It went on to debut to $16 million, finishing third at the box office behind holdovers Venom and A Star Is Born. Anthony D'Alessandro of Deadline Hollywood stated that the under-performance was less a matter of any controversy involving the American flag and more to do with the 141 minute runtime and the film's focus on drama. Michael Cieply, also of Deadline, acknowledged that the flag controversy drew Internet criticism and that it could have hurt the film's performance at the box office. The film fell 47% in its second weekend, grossing $8.6 million and finishing fifth, and then made $4.9 million in its third week, finishing seventh.

=== Critical response ===
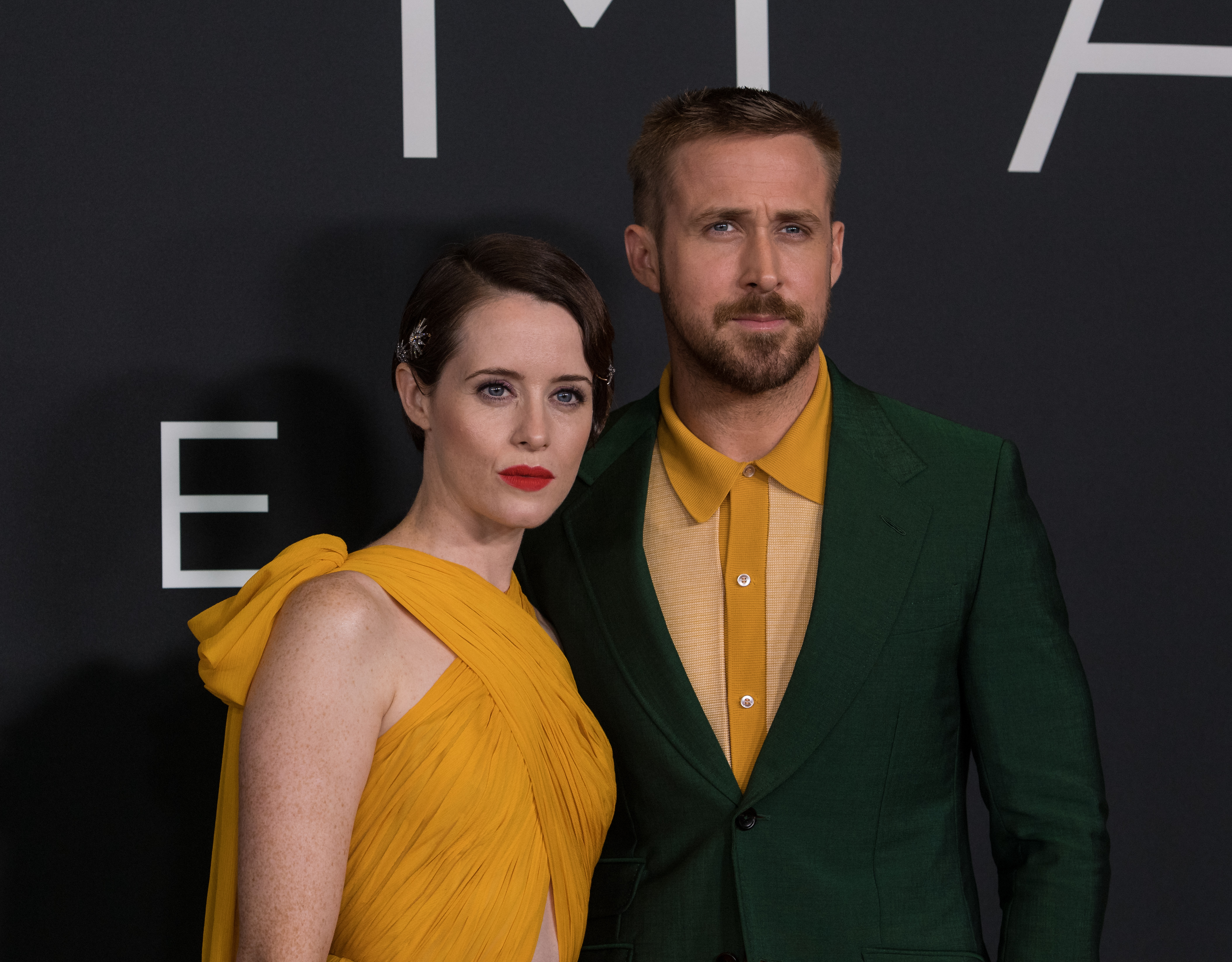
Ryan Gosling and Claire Foy's performances received praise from critics.

On review aggregator Rotten Tomatoes, the film holds an approval rating of 87% based on 468 reviews, with an average rating of 8.1/10. The website's critical consensus reads, "First Man uses a personal focus to fuel a look back at a pivotal moment in human history – and takes audiences on a soaring dramatic journey along the way." On Metacritic, the film has a weighted average score of 84 out of 100, based on 56 critics, indicating "universal acclaim". Audiences polled by CinemaScore gave the film an average grade of "B+" on an A+ to F scale, while PostTrak reported filmgoers gave it a 79% positive score.

Owen Gleiberman of Variety called the film "so revelatory in its realism, so gritty in its physicality, that it becomes a drama of thrillingly hellbent danger and obsession." Writing for IndieWire, Michael Nordine awarded the film a B+, describing it as "A powerful experience that will inspire renewed awe of what Armstrong and his ilk did." Nordine praised the opening flight sequence, Gosling's performance and Chazelle's direction. Peter Howell of the Toronto Star praised the Moon landing sequence, writing: "When the Eagle finally lands on the moon in First Man, the picture truly soars." Nicholas Barber of the BBC gave it a five-star rating, stating that "Gosling and Foy's performances in First Man are probably too unshowy to win awards. But they should, because they could hardly have been bettered. The same goes for the whole of this extraordinary film."

A. O. Scott, of The New York Times, wrote that the film "gets almost everything right, but it's also strangely underwhelming. It reminds you of an extraordinary feat and acquaints you with an interesting, enigmatic man. But there is a further leap beyond technical accomplishment – into meaning, history, metaphysics or the wilder zones of the imagination – that the film is too careful, too earthbound, to attempt." Anthony Lane of The New Yorker said the film "captures the grandeur and otherness of the Apollo saga, but not the Midwestern modesty of its hero, Neil Armstrong," writing: "Skillful and compelling this film may be, but, if Neil Armstrong had been the sort of fellow who was likely to cry on the moon, he wouldn't have been the first man chosen to go there. He would have been the last."

Richard Brody, also of The New Yorker, said First Man would appeal to right-wing proponents as "a film of deluded, cultish longing for an earlier era of American life, one defined not by conservative politics but, rather, by a narrow and regressive emotional perspective that shapes and distorts the substance of the film." Armond White of the National Review gave the film a negative review, writing: "... director Damien Chazelle aims to give a realistic, procedural account of Armstrong's journey, yet the poetry never happens. Chazelle's take is dour, deliberately unromantic."

=== Top ten lists ===
First Man was listed on numerous critics' top ten lists for 2018.

- 1st – Kyle Smith, National Review
- 2nd – Ignatiy Vishnevetsky, The A.V. Club
- 3rd – Angie Han, Mashable
- 4th – Barry Hertz, The Globe and Mail
- 5th – A.A. Dowd, The A.V. Club
- 5th – Lisa Nesselson, Screen Daily
- 5th – Tomris Laffly, Time Out New York
- 6th – Jesse Hassenger, The A.V. Club
- 6th – Mara Reinstein, Us Weekly
- 7th – Chris Wasser, Irish Independent
- 7th – David Rooney, The Hollywood Reporter
- 7th – Peter Travers, Rolling Stone
- 7th – Anne Thompson, Indiewire
- 7th – Matt Singer, ScreenCrush
- 8th – Owen Gleiberman, Variety
- 8th – Chris Nashawaty, Entertainment Weekly
- 9th – Nicholas Barber, BBC
- 9th – Jon Frosch, The Hollywood Reporter
- 9th – Scott Chitwood, ComingSoon.Net
- 9th – K. Austin Collins, Vanity Fair
- 10th – UPROXX
- Top 10 (listed alphabetically) – Joe Morgenstern, The Wall Street Journal
- Top 10 (listed alphabetically) – Hal Boedeker, Orlando Sentinel
- Top 10 (listed alphabetically), IGN
- Top 10 (listed alphabetically), WIRED
- Best of 2018 (listed alphabetically, not ranked), CNN
- Best of 2018 (listed alphabetically, not ranked) – Ty Burr, The Boston Globe

=== Accolades ===
First Man received ten nominations at the 24th Critics' Choice Awards, where it won for Best Editing and Best Score.

At the 76th Golden Globe Awards, Claire Foy was nominated for Best Supporting Actress while Hurwitz again won the award for Best Original Score. The film was nominated for seven categories at the 72nd British Academy Film Awards, but did not win any. At the 91st Academy Awards, the film was nominated in four categories including Best Sound Mixing, Best Sound Editing and Best Production Design, with the film's visual effects team of Paul Lambert, Ian Hunter, Tristan Myles and J. D. Schwalm winning the award for Best Visual Effects.

=== American flag controversy ===
On August 31, 2018, it was reported that the film would not include a scene of Armstrong and Aldrin planting the American flag on the Moon. Florida Senator Marco Rubio described the omission as "total lunacy". Chazelle responded with a statement, saying: "I show the American flag standing on the lunar surface, but the flag being physically planted into the surface is one of several moments [...] that I chose not to focus upon. To address the question of whether this was a political statement, the answer is no. My goal with this movie was to share with audiences the unseen, unknown aspects of America's mission to the Moon." United States President Donald Trump commented on the omission: "It's almost like they're embarrassed at the achievement coming from America, I think it's a terrible thing. When you think of Neil Armstrong and when you think of the landing on the moon, you think about the American flag. For that reason, I wouldn't even want to watch the movie." Following the film's below-expectations opening of $16 million, some analysts speculated that the flag controversy was in part to blame.

== Janet Armstrong ==
The film revived international interest in Armstrong's first wife, Janet, who plays a central part in the film. She died a few months before the film's release.

== Historical accuracy ==
During Armstrong's 1961 flight in an X-15, the rocket plane begins "ballooning" (i.e., bouncing off the top of the atmosphere). The view out the window shows a carpet of clouds just below the wings. However, Armstrong was at 120,000 feet (37,000 m), about twice the altitude at which even the highest clouds form.

Armstrong learns in the same conversation that he will command Apollo 11 and become the first man on the Moon. Apollo astronauts were assigned to their crews sometimes years in advance. For the two-plus years leading up to Apollo 11 it was assumed that the first lunar landing would not be attempted until Apollo 12, 13 or even 14.

On the lunar surface, Armstrong spends a few minutes alone at Little West Crater. He opens his gloved hand to reveal his daughter Karen's tiny bracelet and drops it into the crater. While Armstrong did visit the crater, there is no historical record that he took the bracelet with him to the Moon.

== See also ==
- Apollo 11 in popular culture
