= Julian Scheer =

American merchant mariner, journalist, public relations professional, and author

- 2001 portrait by Hugh Morton
- Born: February 20, 1926; Richmond, Virginia
- Died: September 1, 2001 (aged 75); Catlett, Virginia
- Occupations: Mariner, journalist, author, public relations professional

Julian Weisel Scheer (February 20, 1926 – September 1, 2001) was an American merchant mariner, journalist, public relations professional, and author. He is best known as the assistant administrator of public affairs for the National Aeronautics and Space Administration in Washington, D.C., from 1962 to 1971, and for his contributions to the 1969 Apollo 11 Moon landing mission.

== Early life ==
Julian Weisel Scheer was born in Richmond, Virginia, on January 26, 1926, the son of Hilda Knopf and George Fabian Scheer. During World War II he joined the United States Merchant Marine at the age of 17, and served in the Atlantic and Pacific. After the war he entered the University of North Carolina at Chapel Hill (UNC), from which he graduated in 1950 with a degree in a journalism and communications. While there, he was a spokesman for UNC's sports program.

On graduation, Scheer became an assistant to Jack Wade, the Director of Sports Information at UNC. In 1953, he became a journalist at the local Charlotte, North Carolina, newspaper, The Charlotte News, where he mainly covered sports stories. In 1954 he was part of the media contingent that covered Hurricane Hazel. A photograph of Scheer struggling against the high winds and rising waters earned Charlotte News photographer Hugh Morton an award for Southern Press Photographer of the Year. In 1956, Scheer accepted an invitation from Nelson Benton, a fellow UNC graduate who worked for the WBTV Channel 3 News, to visit Patrick Air Force Base in Cape Canaveral, Florida, where the United States Air Force was testing rockets and missiles. Scheer was fascinated by what he saw, but his editor did not think it was newsworthy. Scheer then returned to the Cape on his own time and dime to watch more missile launches, and wrote a series of articles on the work being done there.

After the space race began in the late 1950s, the subject became of great interest to the public, and Scheer teamed up with NASA engineer Theodore J. Gordon to write a bestseller on the subject, First into Outer Space. It was his third book, after Choo Choo: The Charlie Justice Story (1958), a biography of American football player Charlie Justice, written with Hugh Morton and Bob Quincy, and Tweetsie, the Blue Ridge Stemwinder (1958), a history of the East Tennessee and Western North Carolina Railroad, written with Elizabeth Black.

== NASA ==
Neil Armstrong steps onto the lunar surface

Scheer covered the 1960 presidential election for his newspaper, and got to know Robert F. Kennedy. In 1962, Scheer had begun writing a novel on the civil rights movement when he was contacted by James Webb, the administrator of NASA, who asked him to come to NASA headquarters in Washington, D.C., and develop a plan for coordinating media coverage of the space program. Scheer therefore began working for NASA as a consultant. In early 1963 he became NASA's assistant administrator for public affairs.

In his new role, Scheer soon clashed with Shorty Powers, NASA's public affairs officer. Powers refused to give out the flight plan of upcoming missions, but gave the plan for Gordon Cooper's Mercury-Atlas 9 flight to journalist Jay Barbree for a bottle of Jim Beam. Scheer confronted Powers over this, and ordered him to send out copies to all the news media. When Powers threatened to resign, Scheer accepted his resignation. Henceforth, NASA would make information freely available, not because it felt that it was under any legal obligation to do so, but because it was good policy to do so. Scheer was capable of withholding information; in the wake of the Apollo 1 fire he refused to issue any statement until the families of the three astronauts had been informed of their deaths.

Scheer was responsible for naming the Apollo 11 Command Module Columbia, and was involved in discussions about the lunar flag-raising ceremony, and the words on the plaque left on the Moon, successfully resisting pressure from President Richard Nixon to include mention of God. But perhaps his greatest achievement was overruling the engineers who wanted to minimise the weight carried on board the Lunar Module Eagle and insist that a television camera be taken. As a result, millions were able to watch Neil Armstrong and Buzz Aldrin walk on the Moon.

== Later life ==
Scheer left NASA on February 22, 1971, to become the campaign manager of Terry Sanford’s unsuccessful candidacy in the 1972 presidential election. He remained engaged with the space program as a consultant and a trustee of the Smithsonian Institution's National Air and Space Museum. He worked for a Washington communications consulting firm until 1976, when he became a vice-president of Ling-Temco-Vought (LTV), in charge of its Washington operations. He was LTV's public face during the Reagan administration antitrust suit against it, and later during its bankruptcy and subsequent reorganisation, and an unfavorable United States Supreme Court ruling. He became a consultant again in 1992.

In the early 1990s, Scheer became involved in environmental causes, and was a key strategist in Piedmont Environmental Council's struggle with Disney's America. He became a co-founder of Protect Historic America, a group that marshalled opposition to Disney's America from popular historians like David McCullough and Shelby Foote.

On September 1, 2001, Scheer suffered a heart attack while riding a tractor at his farm in Catlett, Virginia, where he had lived since 1965, and died. He was survived by Suzanne Huggan, his second wife of 36 years, two sons and a daughter from his first marriage to Virginia Williams, which ended in divorce, and a daughter from his second marriage.
