= Tranquility Base =

Landing site of Apollo 11 on the Moon

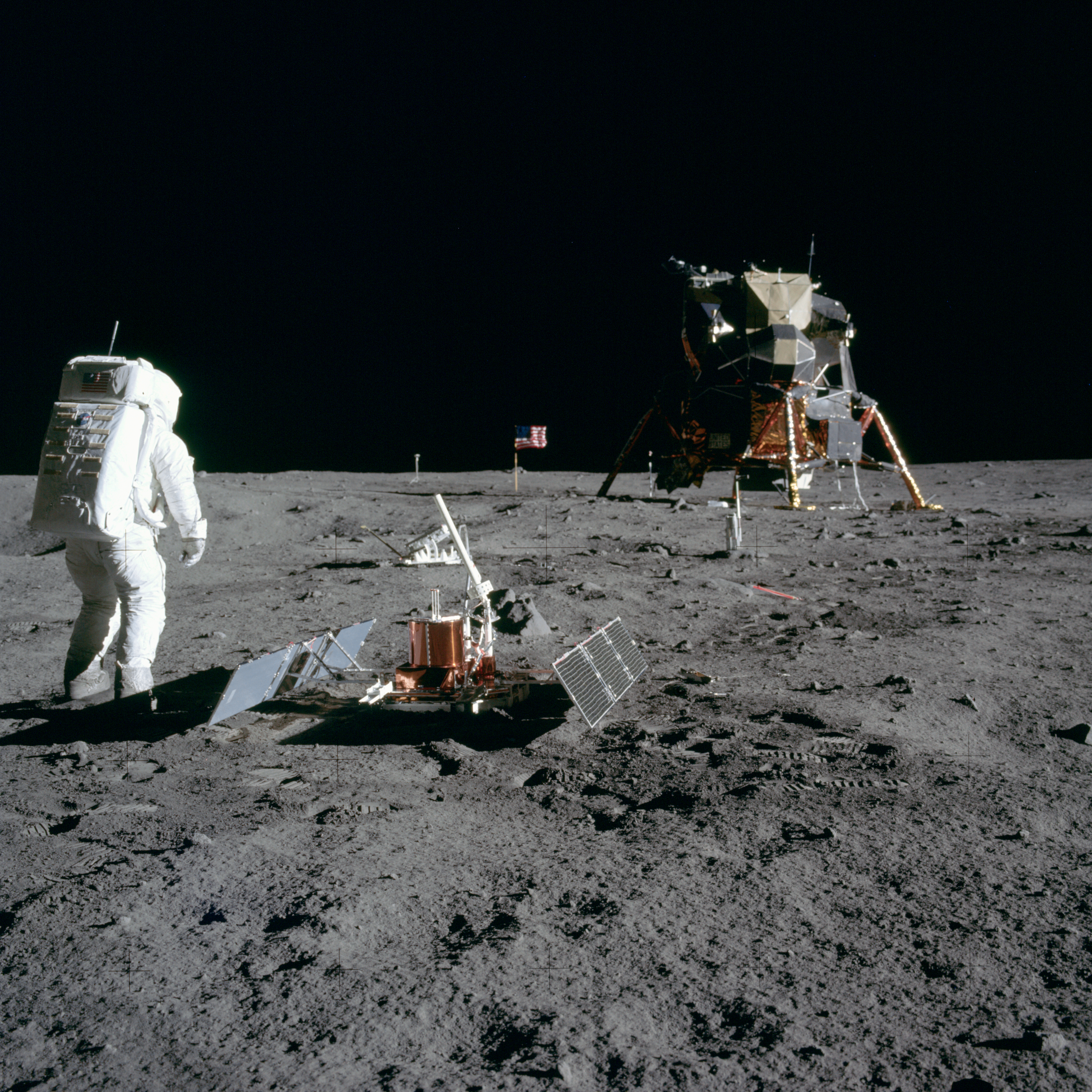
- Astronaut Buzz Aldrin with Apollo Lunar Module Eagle at Tranquility Base; photo taken by Neil Armstrong

- Map of Tranquility Base
- 00°41′15″N 23°26′00″E
- Type: Extraterrestrial landing site
- Location: Mare Tranquillitatis, Moon

History
- Named and founded: July 20, 1969; 57 years ago
- Founder: Neil Armstrong and Buzz Aldrin

Site notes
- Governing body: California, New Mexico

Tranquility Base (Latin: Statio Tranquillitatis) is the site on the Moon where, in July 1969, American NASA astronauts landed and walked on a celestial body other than Earth for the first time. On July 20, 1969, Apollo 11 crewmembers Neil Armstrong and Buzz Aldrin landed their Apollo Lunar Module Eagle at approximately 20:17:40 UTC. Armstrong exited the spacecraft six hours and 39 minutes after touchdown, followed 19 minutes later by Aldrin. The astronauts spent two hours and 31 minutes examining and photographing the lunar surface, setting up several scientific experiment packages, and collecting 47.5 pounds (21.5 kg) of dirt and rock samples for return to Earth. They lifted off the surface on July 21 at 17:54 UTC. The two named the base, which Armstrong announced when the Lunar Module Eagle landed. It is located in the south-western corner of the dark lunar plain Mare Tranquillitatis ("Sea of Tranquility").

Due to involvement of facilities within the U.S. states of California and New Mexico with the Apollo program, the relevant government bodies in these states have registered Tranquility Base as a historic site associated with the heritage of the respective state: California's State Historical Resources Commission in the California Register of Historical Resources, and the New Mexico Historic Preservation Division of the New Mexico Department of Cultural Affairs in the New Mexico State Register of Cultural Properties site #1946. However, Texas, the U.S. National Park Service, and UNESCO have declined to do so, citing the procedural technicality that it is not located within their borders, which, according to common convention, do not extend thousands of miles beyond the Earth's surface.

== Site selection ==
For more than two years, NASA planners considered a collection of 30 potential sites for the first crewed landing. Based on high-resolution photographs taken by the Lunar Orbiter spacecraft, and photos and data taken by the uncrewed Surveyor landers, this list was narrowed down to five sites located near the lunar equator. They ranged between 45 degrees east and west, and 5 degrees north and south of the center of the Moon's facing side. They were numbered 1 to 5, going from east to west. Site number 2, centered at 0°42′50″N 23°42′28″E, was the Sea of Tranquility site ultimately chosen. Since a precision landing was not expected on the first mission, the target area was an ellipse measuring 11.5 miles (18.5 km) east and west by 3.0 miles (4.8 km) north and south.

On the landing, a combination of thrust from residual pressure in the docking tunnel that connected the Lunar Module with the command module Columbia in orbit, and an imperfect understanding of the Moon's uneven gravitational field, resulted in navigation errors which pushed the powered descent initiation point about 3 miles (4.8 km), and thus the computer-targeted landing spot about 4 miles (6.4 km), downrange (west) of the planned target. The automated targeting system was taking Eagle toward what Armstrong described as a "football-field sized crater, with a large number of big boulders and rocks for about one or two crater diameters around it", which he avoided by assuming manual control and flying a bit farther downrange. The landing was still within the target ellipse.

== Name ==
Armstrong pilots the Apollo Lunar Module Eagle and lands on the Moon, July 20, 1969, creating Tranquility Base

Armstrong announced the name of the site at 20:17:58 UTC, approximately 18 seconds after his and Aldrin's successful landing, as he announced:

Houston, Tranquility Base here. The Eagle has landed.

During training, Armstrong and Aldrin had exclusively used the callsign "Eagle" in simulated ground conversations, both before and after landing. Armstrong and Aldrin decided on using "Tranquility Base" just before the flight, telling only Capsule Communicator Charles Duke before the mission, so Duke would not be taken by surprise.

The name has become a permanent designation for the site. Although the name was designated by the Apollo astronauts, the International Astronomical Union officially recognizes the designation "Tranquility Base". It is listed on lunar maps as Statio Tranquillitatis, conforming to the standard use of Latin for lunar place names.

== Status ==
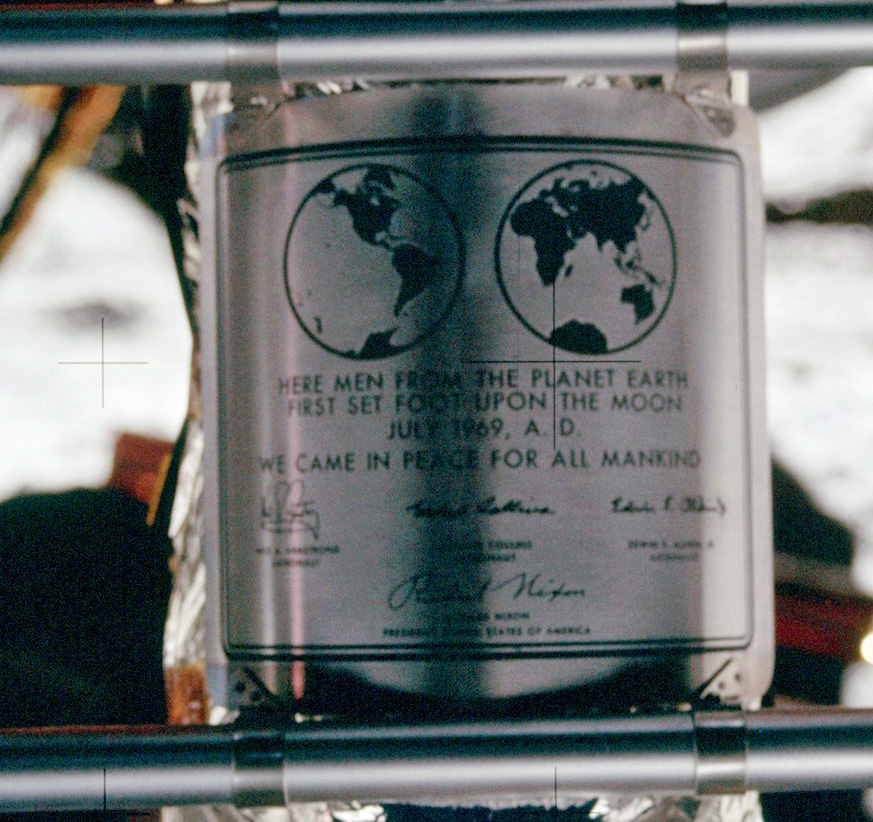
The plaque left at Tranquility Base on the Lunar Module Descent Stage which commemorates the first crewed lunar landing (photographed by Neil Armstrong)

About 100 artificial objects, as well as footprints left by Armstrong and Aldrin, remain at Tranquility Base, and Armstrong commented that during the launch of Eagle's ascent stage he could see "Kapton and other parts on the LM staging scattering all around the area for great distances." The descent stage of the Lunar Module remains at the original point of landing. According to Aldrin (with apparent confirmation from later Lunar Reconnaissance Orbiter photos), the US flag planted at the site during their moonwalk was blown over by the ascent rocket exhaust, but remains on the surface of the Moon. A laser reflector was placed at the site to allow precise ongoing measurements of the distance to the Moon from Earth. A solar-powered seismometer was also left to measure moonquakes, but this stopped functioning after 21 days. A disc containing the Apollo 11 goodwill messages was left at the site, and various gear that was no longer needed for the return phase of the mission—including Aldrin's boots—was left behind to lighten the craft for return to lunar orbit.

As the site of the first human landing on an extraterrestrial body, Tranquility Base has cultural and historic significance. The U.S. states of California and New Mexico have listed it on their heritage registers, since their laws require only that listed sites have some association with the state. Texas has not granted similar status to the site, despite the location of Mission Control in Houston, as its historic preservation laws limit such designations to properties located within the state. The U.S. National Park Service has declined to grant it National Historic Landmark status to avoid violating the Outer Space Treaty's prohibition on any nation claiming sovereignty over any extraterrestrial body. It has not been proposed as a World Heritage Site since the United Nations Educational, Scientific and Cultural Organization (UNESCO), which oversees that program, limits nations to submitting sites within their own borders.

Interest in according the site some formal protection grew in the early 21st century with the announcement of the Google Lunar X Prize for private corporations to successfully build spacecraft and reach the Moon; a $1 million bonus was offered for any competitor that visited a historic site on the Moon. One team, led by Astrobotic Technology, announced it would attempt to land a craft at Tranquility Base. Although it canceled those plans, the ensuing controversy led NASA to request that any other missions to the Moon, private or governmental, human or robotic, keep a distance of at least 75 meters (246 ft) from the site.

In 2020, the One Small Step to Protect Human Heritage in Space Act was enacted, protecting Tranquility Base and other Apollo landing sites from damage from US-licensed space activity.

== Gallery ==
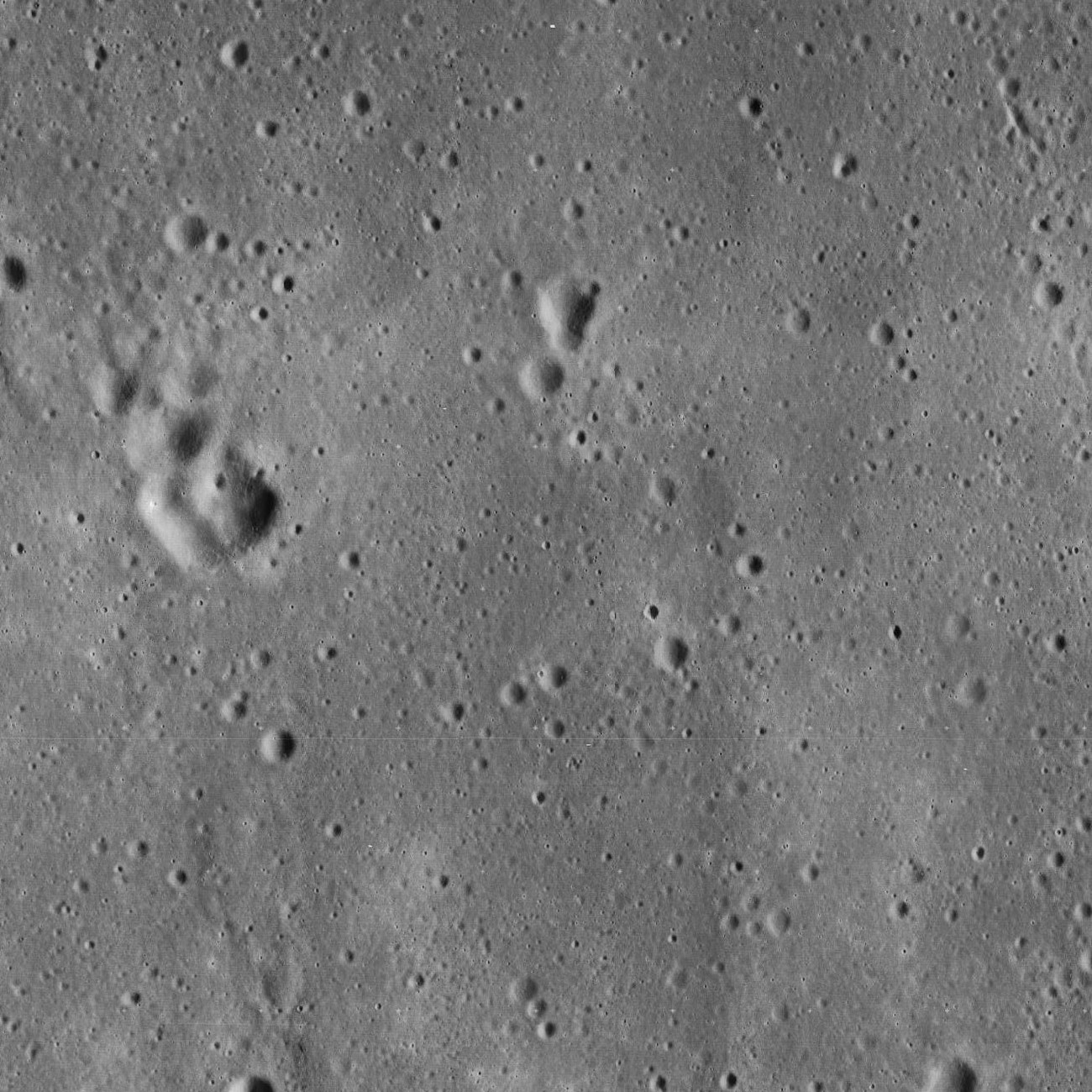
Lunar Orbiter 5 image from 1967, cropped to show the vicinity of the landing site of Apollo 11, used in mission planning. The image is centered precisely on a small crater called West crater (190 m in diameter), and the Lunar Module Eagle touched down about 550 m west of West Crater. The area shown is approximately 25 km × 25 km across.

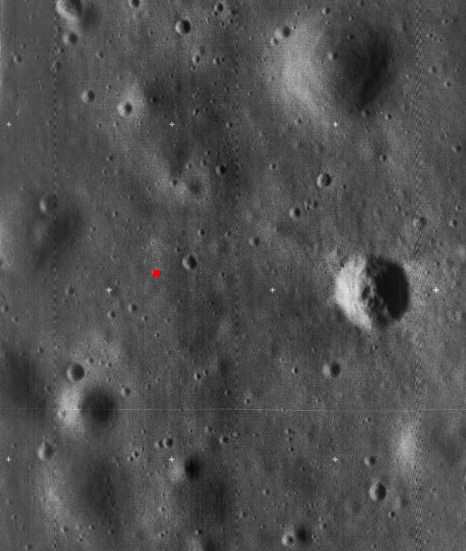
High-resolution Lunar Orbiter 5 image cropped to show the landing site of Apollo 11. The landing site is indicated by a red dot. The prominent crater at right is called West crater and is about 190 m in diameter.

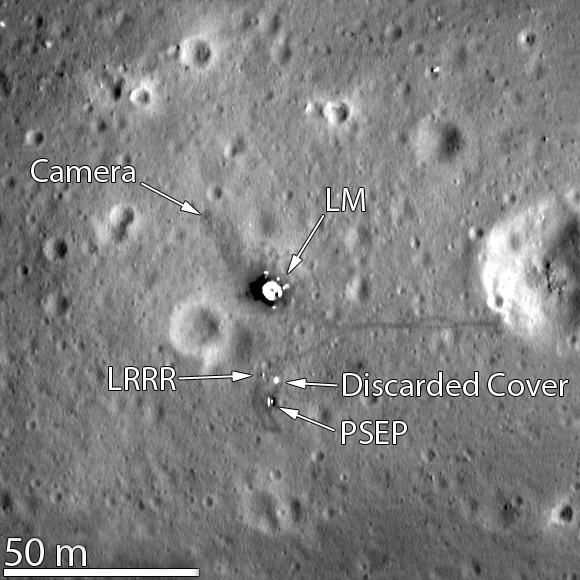
Lunar Reconnaissance Orbiter photo taken March 7, 2012. The Lunar Module descent stage, Laser Ranging RetroReflector, and Early Apollo Scientific Experiments Package can be clearly seen. The craters Little West (at right) and Double (left of LM) are also shown.

Buzz Aldrin's footprint at Tranquility Base (photograph by Aldrin)

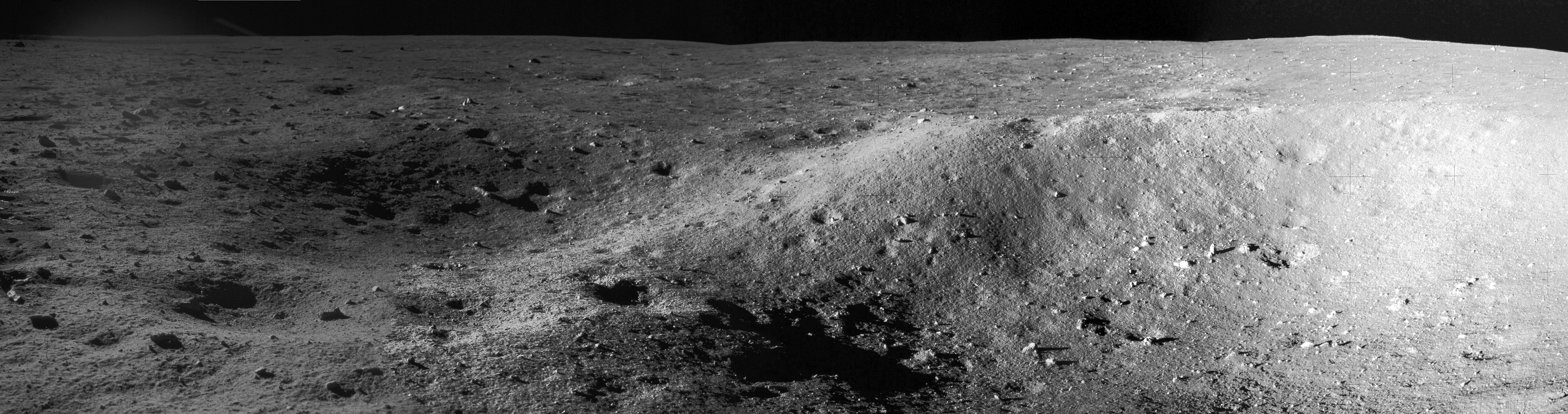
Composite image of Double crater, a few meters from Eagle. Photos by Aldrin.

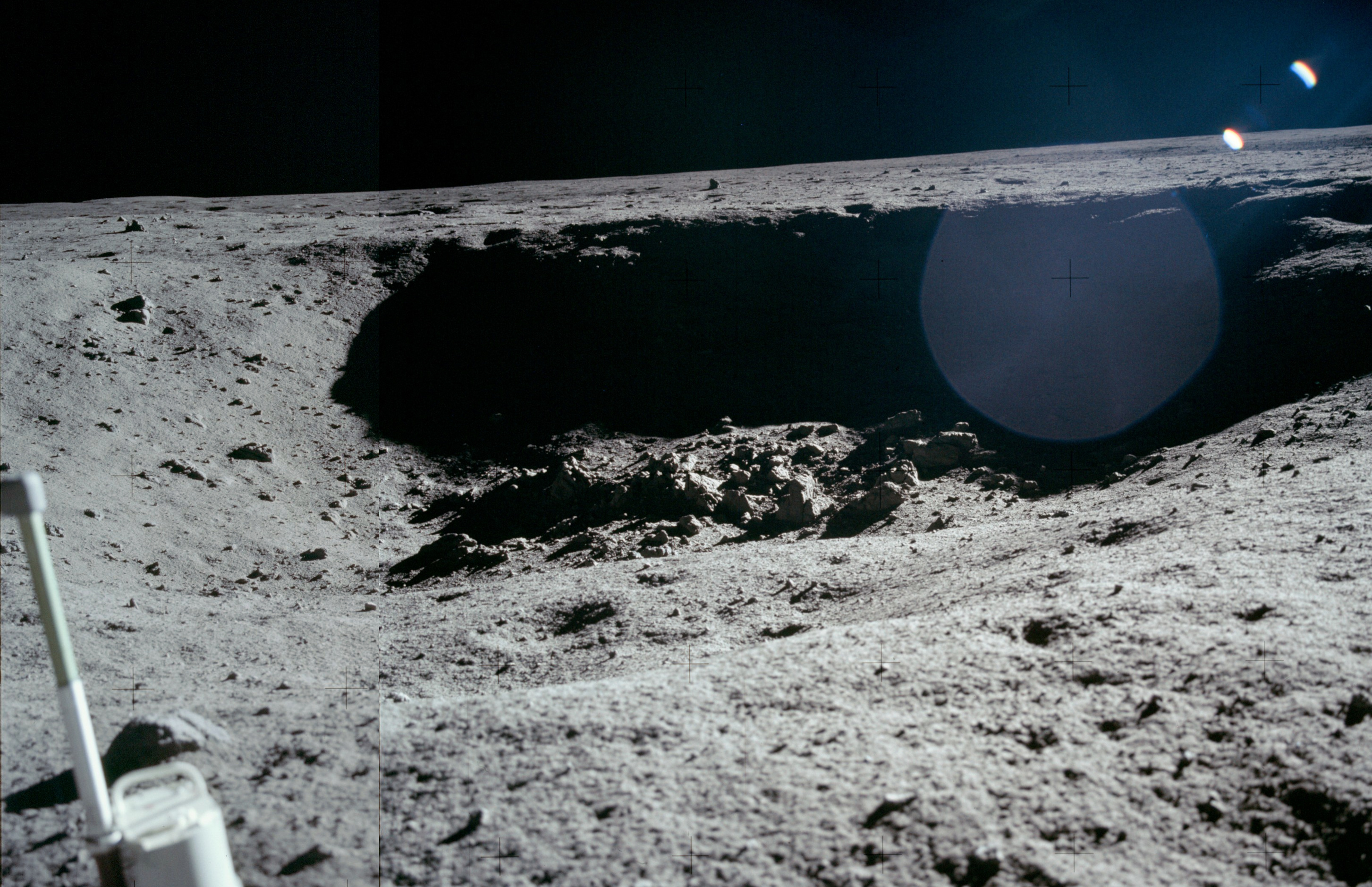
Composite image of Little West Crater, app. 60 meters from Eagle. Photos by Armstrong.

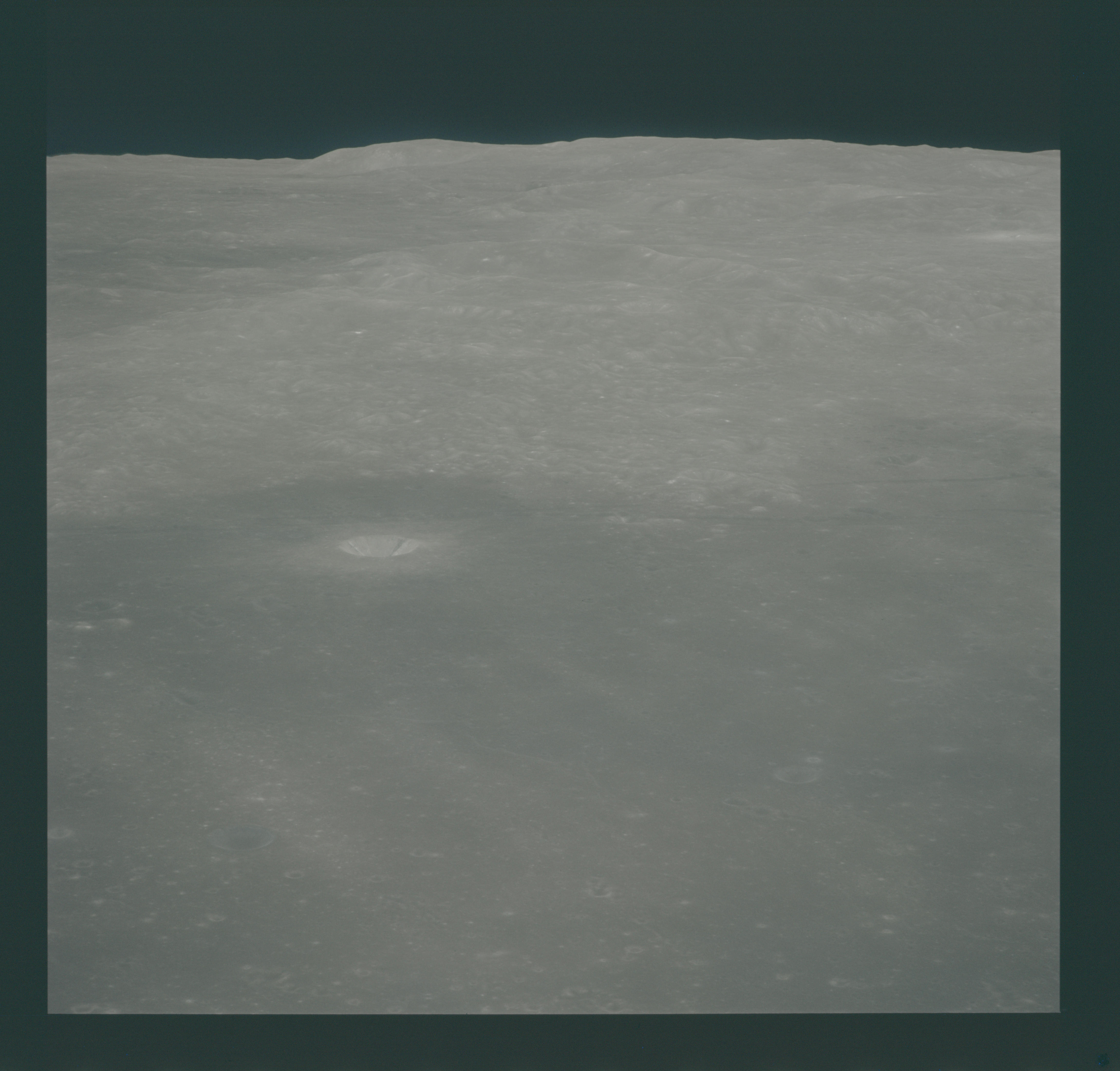
Orbital photo from Apollo 15 showing the landing site just below center. The bright crater is Moltke.

== In popular culture ==
Tranquility Base has been depicted in many books, films and television shows, such as in the 1996 novel The Tranquillity Alternative by Allen Steele, the 1998 mini-series From the Earth to the Moon, the 2015 series The Astronaut Wives Club, and the 2018 film First Man.

Tranquility Base is referenced in "Boat on the River" (". . . all roads lead to Tranquility Base...") by the American Rock band Styx, from their 1979 album Cornerstone.

Tranquility Base is referenced in indie rock band Arctic Monkeys' 2018 album, Tranquility Base Hotel & Casino, as the location of a hotel and casino.

== See also ==
- Apollo 11 lunar sample display
- Apollo 11 in popular culture
- List of archaeological sites beyond national boundaries
- Moonbase
- Space archaeology
- Statio Cognitum, the Apollo 12 landing site
- Tranquility (ISS module), namesake
