= List of accolades received by First Man =

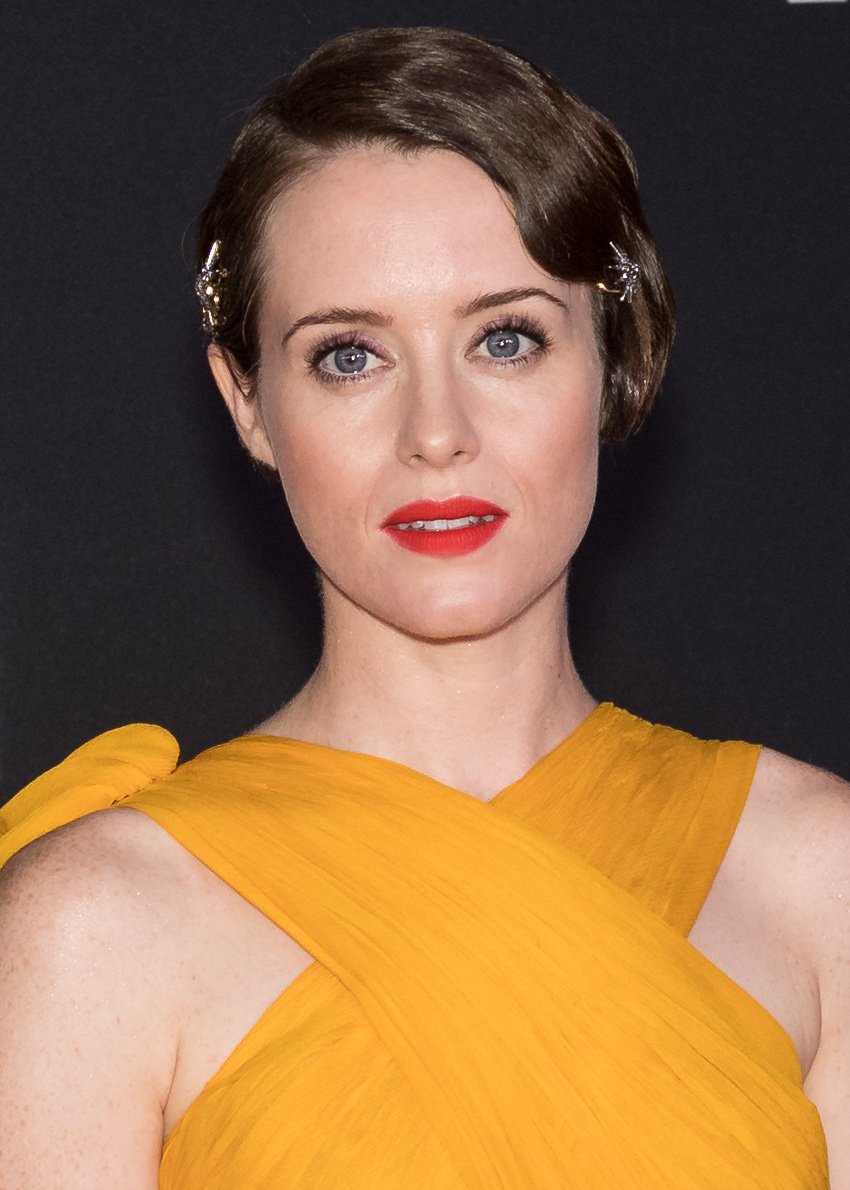
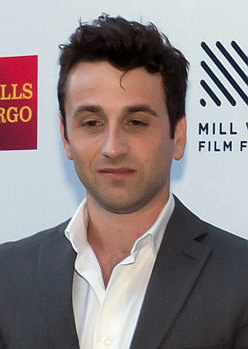
- Claire Foy was praised for her performance, and Justin Hurwitz for his score.
Accolades
Award	Wins	Nominations
AACTA International Awards	0	1
AARP's Movies for Grownups Awards	0	2
Academy Awards	1	4
Alliance of Women Film Journalists	0	2
American Cinema Editors Awards	0	1
American Society of Cinematographers	0	1
Art Directors Guild Awards	0	1
Austin Film Critics Association	1	4
Boston Society of Film Critics	2	2
British Academy Film Awards	0	7
Camerimage	0	1
Capri Hollywood International Film Festival	2	2
Chicago Film Critics Association	0	4
Cinema Audio Society Awards	0	1
Critics' Choice Movie Awards	2	10
Dallas–Fort Worth Film Critics Association	2	2
Dublin Film Critics' Circle	3	3
Florida Film Critics Circle	2	8
Georgia Film Critics Association	1	6
Golden Globe Awards	1	2
Hollywood Film Awards	3	3
Hollywood Music in Media Awards	0	1
Houston Film Critics Society	1	4
IndieWire Critics Poll	1	1
London Film Critics' Circle	0	4
Los Angeles Film Critics Association	1	1
Motion Picture Sound Editors	0	3
Online Film Critics Society	0	3
San Francisco Film Critics Circle	0	4
Satellite Awards	1	7
Seattle Film Critics Society	0	5
St. Louis Film Critics Association	0	4
Vancouver Film Critics Circle	0	1
Venice Film Festival	0	1
Visual Effects Society Awards	1	2
Washington D.C. Area Film Critics Association	1	4

Totals (Note: Certain award groups do not simply award one winner. They acknowledge several different recipients, have runners-up, and have third place. Since this is a specific recognition and is different from losing an award, runner-up mentions are considered wins in this award tally. For simplification and to avoid errors, each award in this list has been presumed to have had a prior nomination.)
- Wins: 25
- Nominations: 112

First Man is a 2018 American biographical drama film directed by Damien Chazelle and written by Josh Singer. Based on the book First Man: The Life of Neil A. Armstrong by James R. Hansen, the film stars Ryan Gosling as Neil Armstrong, alongside Claire Foy, Jason Clarke, Kyle Chandler, Corey Stoll, Ciarán Hinds, Christopher Abbott, Patrick Fugit, and Lukas Haas, and follows the years leading up to the Apollo 11 mission to the Moon in 1969. Steven Spielberg serves as an executive producer.

First Man had its world premiere at the Venice Film Festival on August 29, 2018, and was theatrically released in the United States on October 12, 2018, by Universal Pictures. The film received critical praise, particularly regarding the direction, Gosling and Foy's performances, musical score, and the Moon landing sequence, although its choice to not depict the planting of the American flag on the lunar surface led critics and politicians from both political parties to debate the film's stance on patriotism. It grossed over $102 million worldwide against its $59 million production budget, and received numerous award nominations, including two nominations for Best Supporting Actress (Foy) and Best Original Score (winning the latter) at the 76th Golden Globe Awards and seven nominations at the 72nd British Academy Film Awards. The film also received Oscar nominations for Best Sound Mixing, Best Sound Editing, and Best Production Design, and it won for Best Visual Effects at the 91st Academy Awards.

== Accolades ==
Award	Date of ceremony	Category	Recipient(s)	Result	Ref.
AACTA International Awards	January 4, 2019	Best Supporting Actress	Claire Foy	Nominated	
AARP's Movies for Grownups Awards	February 4, 2019	Best Time Capsule	First Man	Nominated	
AARP's Movies for Grownups Awards	February 4, 2019	Readers' Choice Poll	First Man	Nominated	
Academy Awards	February 24, 2019	Best Production Design	Nathan Crowley and Kathy Lucas	Nominated	
Academy Awards	February 24, 2019	Best Sound Editing	Ai-Ling Lee and Mildred Iatrou Morgan	Nominated	
Academy Awards	February 24, 2019	Best Sound Mixing	Jon Taylor, Frank A. Montaño, Ai-Ling Lee and Mary H. Ellis	Nominated	
Academy Awards	February 24, 2019	Best Visual Effects	Paul Lambert, Ian Hunter, Tristan Myles and J. D. Schwalm	Won	
Alliance of Women Film Journalists	January 9, 2019	Best Supporting Actress	Claire Foy	Nominated	
Alliance of Women Film Journalists	January 9, 2019	Best Cinematography	Linus Sandgren	Nominated	
American Cinema Editors Awards	February 1, 2019	Best Edited Feature Film – Dramatic	Tom Cross	Nominated	
American Society of Cinematographers	February 9, 2019	Outstanding Achievement in Cinematography in Theatrical Releases	Linus Sandgren	Nominated	
Art Directors Guild Awards	February 2, 2019	Excellence in Production Design for a Period Film	Nathan Crowley	Nominated	
Austin Film Critics Association	January 7, 2019	Best Supporting Actress	Claire Foy	Nominated	
Austin Film Critics Association	January 7, 2019	Best Original Score	Justin Hurwitz	Nominated	
Austin Film Critics Association	January 7, 2019	Best Cinematography	Linus Sandgren	Nominated	
Austin Film Critics Association	January 7, 2019	Best Editing	Tom Cross	Won	
Boston Society of Film Critics	December 16, 2018	Best Editing	Tom Cross	Won	
Boston Society of Film Critics	December 16, 2018	Best Original Score	Justin Hurwitz	Runner-up	
British Academy Film Awards	February 10, 2019	Best Supporting Actress	Claire Foy	Nominated	
British Academy Film Awards	February 10, 2019	Best Adapted Screenplay	Josh Singer	Nominated	
British Academy Film Awards	February 10, 2019	Best Cinematography	Linus Sandgren	Nominated	
British Academy Film Awards	February 10, 2019	Best Production Design	Nathan Crowley and Kathy Lucas	Nominated	
British Academy Film Awards	February 10, 2019	Best Sound	Mary H. Ellis, Mildred Iatrou Morgan, Ai-Ling Lee, Frank A. Montaño and Jon Taylor	Nominated	
British Academy Film Awards	February 10, 2019	Best Special Visual Effects	Ian Hunter, Paul Lambert, Tristan Myles and J. D. Schwalm	Nominated	
British Academy Film Awards	February 10, 2019	Best Editing	Tom Cross	Nominated	
Camerimage	November 17, 2018	Golden Frog	Linus Sandgren	Nominated	
Capri Hollywood International Film Festival	January 2, 2019	Best Original Score	Justin Hurwitz	Won	
Capri Hollywood International Film Festival	January 2, 2019	Best Visual Effects	First Man	Won	
Chicago Film Critics Association	December 8, 2018	Best Original Score	Justin Hurwitz	Nominated	
Chicago Film Critics Association	December 8, 2018	Best Editing	Tom Cross	Nominated	
Chicago Film Critics Association	December 8, 2018	Best Cinematography	Linus Sandgren	Nominated	
Chicago Film Critics Association	December 8, 2018	Best Use of Visual Effects	First Man	Nominated	
Cinema Audio Society Awards	February 16, 2019	Outstanding Achievement in Sound Mixing for a Feature Film	First Man	Nominated	
Critics' Choice Movie Awards	January 13, 2019	Best Picture	First Man	Nominated	
Critics' Choice Movie Awards	January 13, 2019	Best Director	Damien Chazelle	Nominated	
Critics' Choice Movie Awards	January 13, 2019	Best Actor	Ryan Gosling	Nominated	
Critics' Choice Movie Awards	January 13, 2019	Best Supporting Actress	Claire Foy	Nominated	
Critics' Choice Movie Awards	January 13, 2019	Best Adapted Screenplay	Josh Singer	Nominated	
Critics' Choice Movie Awards	January 13, 2019	Best Cinematography	Linus Sandgren	Nominated	
Critics' Choice Movie Awards	January 13, 2019	Best Production Design	Nathan Crowley and Kathy Lucas	Nominated	
Critics' Choice Movie Awards	January 13, 2019	Best Editing	Tom Cross	Won	
Critics' Choice Movie Awards	January 13, 2019	Best Visual Effects	First Man	Nominated	
Critics' Choice Movie Awards	January 13, 2019	Best Score	Justin Hurwitz	Won	
Dallas–Fort Worth Film Critics Association	December 17, 2018	Best Supporting Actress	Claire Foy	5th place	
Dallas–Fort Worth Film Critics Association	December 17, 2018	Best Musical Score	Justin Hurwitz	2nd place	
Dublin Film Critics' Circle	December 20, 2018	Best Film	First Man	9th place	
Dublin Film Critics' Circle	December 20, 2018	Best Director	Damien Chazelle	5th place	
Dublin Film Critics' Circle	December 20, 2018	Best Cinematography	Linus Sandgren	Won	
Florida Film Critics Circle	December 21, 2018	Best Picture	First Man	Nominated	
Florida Film Critics Circle	December 21, 2018	Best Supporting Actress	Claire Foy	Runner-up	
Florida Film Critics Circle	December 21, 2018	Best Director	Damien Chazelle	Nominated	
Florida Film Critics Circle	December 21, 2018	Best Adapted Screenplay	Josh Singer and James R. Hansen	Nominated	
Florida Film Critics Circle	December 21, 2018	Best Cinematography	Linus Sandgren	Nominated	
Florida Film Critics Circle	December 21, 2018	Best Score	Justin Hurwitz	Won	
Florida Film Critics Circle	December 21, 2018	Best Art Direction / Production Design	First Man	Nominated	
Florida Film Critics Circle	December 21, 2018	Best Visual Effects	First Man	Nominated	
Georgia Film Critics Association	January 12, 2019	Best Picture	First Man	Nominated	
Georgia Film Critics Association	January 12, 2019	Best Supporting Actress	Claire Foy	Nominated	
Georgia Film Critics Association	January 12, 2019	Best Cinematography	Linus Sandgren	Nominated	
Georgia Film Critics Association	January 12, 2019	Best Original Score	Justin Hurwitz	Won	
Georgia Film Critics Association	January 12, 2019	Best Production Design	Nathan Crowley and Kathy Lucas	Nominated	
Georgia Film Critics Association	January 12, 2019	Oglethorpe Award for Excellence in Georgia Cinema	First Man	Nominated	
Golden Globe Awards	January 6, 2019	Best Supporting Actress	Claire Foy	Nominated	
Golden Globe Awards	January 6, 2019	Best Original Score	Justin Hurwitz	Won	
Heartland Film Festival	October 11 – 21, 2018	Truly Moving Picture Award	First Man	Won	
Hollywood Film Awards	November 4, 2018	Hollywood Director Award	Damien Chazelle	Won	
Hollywood Film Awards	November 4, 2018	Hollywood Film Composer Award	Justin Hurwitz	Won	
Hollywood Film Awards	November 4, 2018	Hollywood Editor Award	Tom Cross	Won	
Hollywood Music in Media Awards	November 14, 2018	Original Score – Feature Film	Justin Hurwitz	Nominated	
Houston Film Critics Society	January 3, 2019	Best Supporting Actress	Claire Foy	Nominated	
Houston Film Critics Society	January 3, 2019	Best Cinematography	Linus Sandgren	Nominated	
Houston Film Critics Society	January 3, 2019	Best Original Score	Justin Hurwitz	Nominated	
Houston Film Critics Society	January 3, 2019	Best Visual Effects	First Man	Won	
IndieWire Critics Poll	December 17, 2018	Best Cinematography	First Man	4th place	
London Film Critics' Circle	January 20, 2019	Film of the Year	First Man	Nominated	
London Film Critics' Circle	January 20, 2019	Supporting Actress of the Year	Claire Foy	Nominated	
London Film Critics' Circle	January 20, 2019	British / Irish Actress of the Year	Claire Foy	Nominated	
London Film Critics' Circle	January 20, 2019	Technical Achievement Award	Paul Lambert	Nominated	
Los Angeles Film Critics Association	December 9, 2018	Best Music	Justin Hurwitz	Runner-up	
Motion Picture Sound Editors	February 17, 2019	Feature Film – Music Underscore	First Man	Nominated	
Motion Picture Sound Editors	February 17, 2019	Feature Film – Dialogue / ADR	Mildred Iatrou, Ai-Ling Lee, Susan Dawes, Galen Goodpaster	Nominated	
Motion Picture Sound Editors	February 17, 2019	Feature Film – Effects / Foley	First Man	Nominated	
Online Film Critics Society	January 2, 2019	Best Original Score	Justin Hurwitz	Nominated	
Online Film Critics Society	January 2, 2019	Best Cinematography	Linus Sandgren	Nominated	
Online Film Critics Society	January 2, 2019	Best Editing	Tom Cross	Nominated	
San Francisco Film Critics Circle	December 9, 2018	Best Cinematography	Linus Sandgren	Nominated	
San Francisco Film Critics Circle	December 9, 2018	Best Original Score	Justin Hurwitz	Nominated	
San Francisco Film Critics Circle	December 9, 2018	Best Film Editing	Tom Cross	Nominated	
San Francisco Film Critics Circle	December 9, 2018	Best Production Design	Nathan Crowley	Nominated	
Satellite Awards	February 22, 2019	Best Motion Picture – Drama	First Man	Nominated	
Satellite Awards	February 22, 2019	Best Actor – Drama	Ryan Gosling	Nominated	
Satellite Awards	February 22, 2019	Best Supporting Actress	Claire Foy	Nominated	
Satellite Awards	February 22, 2019	Best Original Score	Justin Hurwitz	Won	
Satellite Awards	February 22, 2019	Best Film Editing	Tom Cross	Nominated	
Satellite Awards	February 22, 2019	Best Art Direction and Production Design	Nathan Crowley	Nominated	
Satellite Awards	February 22, 2019	Best Sound	First Man	Nominated	
Seattle Film Critics Society	December 17, 2018	Best Supporting Actress	Claire Foy	Nominated	
Seattle Film Critics Society	December 17, 2018	Best Film Editing	Tom Cross	Nominated	
Seattle Film Critics Society	December 17, 2018	Best Original Score	Justin Hurwitz	Nominated	
Seattle Film Critics Society	December 17, 2018	Best Production Design	Nathan Crowley and Kathy Lucas	Nominated	
Seattle Film Critics Society	December 17, 2018	Best Visual Effects	Paul Lambert, Tristan Myles, Ian Hunter and J. D. Schwalm	Nominated	
St. Louis Film Critics Association	December 16, 2018	Best Cinematography	Linus Sandgren	Nominated	
St. Louis Film Critics Association	December 16, 2018	Best Score	Justin Hurwitz	Nominated	
St. Louis Film Critics Association	December 16, 2018	Best Editing	Tom Cross	Nominated	
St. Louis Film Critics Association	December 16, 2018	Best Production Design	Nathan Crowley	Nominated	
Vancouver Film Critics Circle	December 17, 2018	Best Supporting Actor, Female	Claire Foy	Nominated	
Venice Film Festival	September 8, 2018	Golden Lion	First Man	Nominated	
Visual Effects Society Awards	February 5, 2019	Outstanding Supporting Visual Effects in a Photoreal Feature	Paul Lambert, Kevin Elam, Tristan Myles, Ian Hunter and J. D. Schwalm	Won	
Visual Effects Society Awards	February 5, 2019	Outstanding Compositing in a Photoreal Feature	Joel Delle-Vergin, Peter Farkas, Miles Lauridsen and Francesco Dell’Anna	Nominated	
Washington D.C. Area Film Critics Association	December 3, 2018	Best Production Design	Nathan Crowley and Kathy Lucas	Nominated	
Washington D.C. Area Film Critics Association	December 3, 2018	Best Cinematography	Linus Sandgren	Nominated	
Washington D.C. Area Film Critics Association	December 3, 2018	Best Editing	Tom Cross	Won	
Washington D.C. Area Film Critics Association	December 3, 2018	Best Original Score	Justin Hurwitz	Nominated	

== See also ==
- 2018 in film
