= West (lunar crater) =

Crater on the Moon

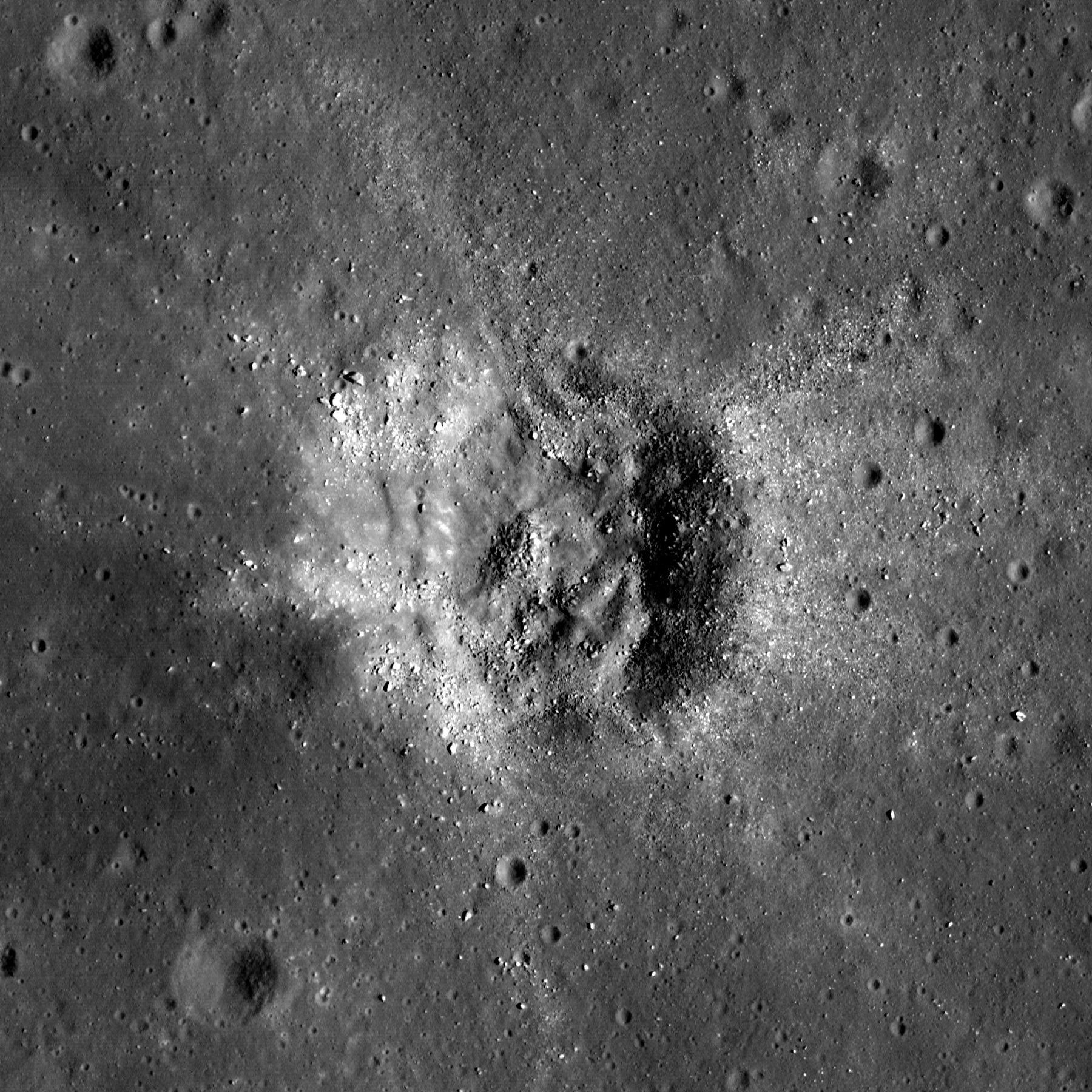
- LRO image
- Coordinates: 0.67°N 23.49°E
- Diameter: 190 m
- Eponym: Astronaut-named feature

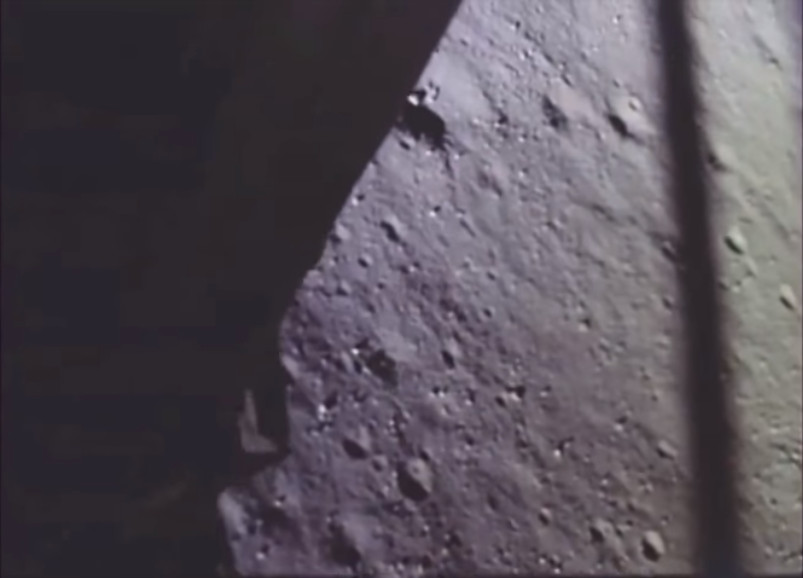
The view of West crater and the northern portion of its ejecta blanket of boulders, from the Apollo 11 Lunar Module Eagle during descent to the surface. West is the largest crater, near the top, partially obscured by the Lunar Module. Facing west from about 450 feet above the surface.

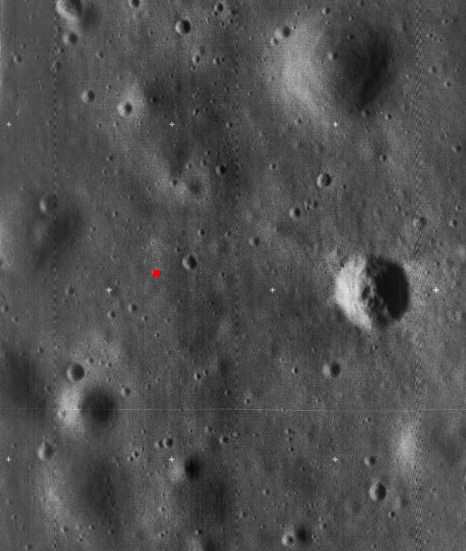
Lunar Orbiter 5 image with West at right and the Apollo 11 landing site at red dot

West crater is a small crater in Mare Tranquillitatis on the Moon, east of the Apollo 11 landing site, which is known as Tranquility Base. The name of the crater was formally adopted by the IAU in 1973.

The Apollo 11 astronauts Neil Armstrong and Buzz Aldrin landed the Lunar Module (LM) Eagle approximately 550 meters west of West crater on July 20, 1969. During the descent, West crater was a major landmark. The lunar lander flew over the crater at an altitude of about 100 meters. The boulder field that Armstrong saw a need to avoid during the descent was the ejecta of West crater. Just beyond this ejecta was Little West crater which also had to be avoided.

At the time of Apollo 11, the words “east” and “west” were used to describe directions on the Moon from the perspective of an observer on Earth. The crater was therefore named “West Crater” even though it appears to the east of the landing site on modern lunar maps.
