= Double (lunar crater) =

Crater on the Moon

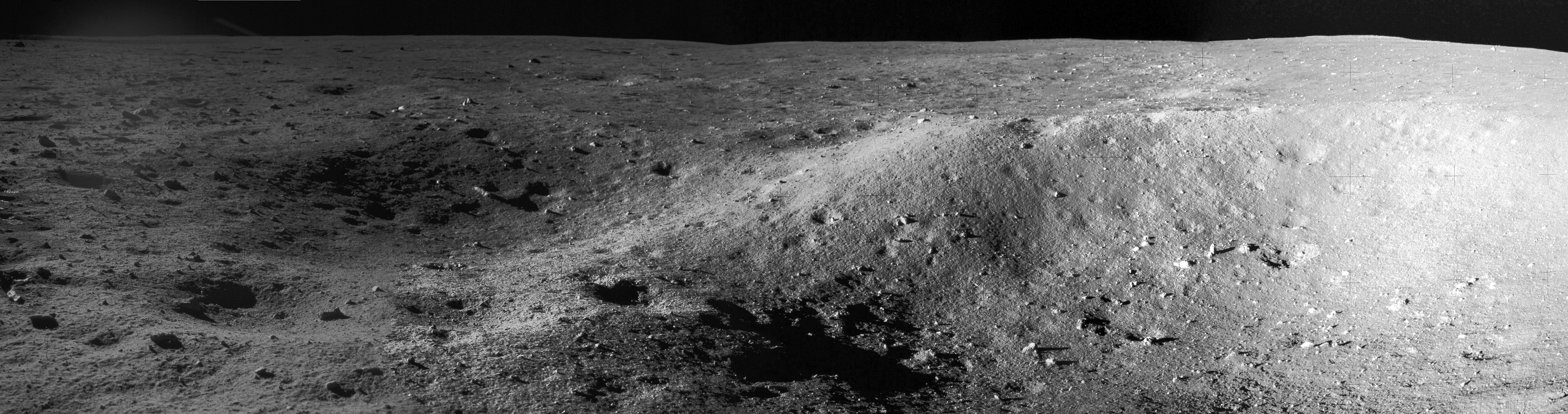
- Composite image of Double crater. Photos were taken by Buzz Aldrin
- Coordinates: 0.67°N 23.47°E
- Diameter: 10 m

Double is a small crater (10-meter diameter) in Mare Tranquillitatis on the Moon, within the Apollo 11 landing site known as Tranquility Base.

The Apollo 11 astronauts Neil Armstrong and Buzz Aldrin landed the Lunar Module Eagle next to Double on July 20, 1969.

The name was officially approved by IAU's Working Group for Planetary System Nomenclature on July 26, 2017 alongside another small crater near the landing site called Little West.
