= Little West (lunar crater) =

Small crater on the Moon

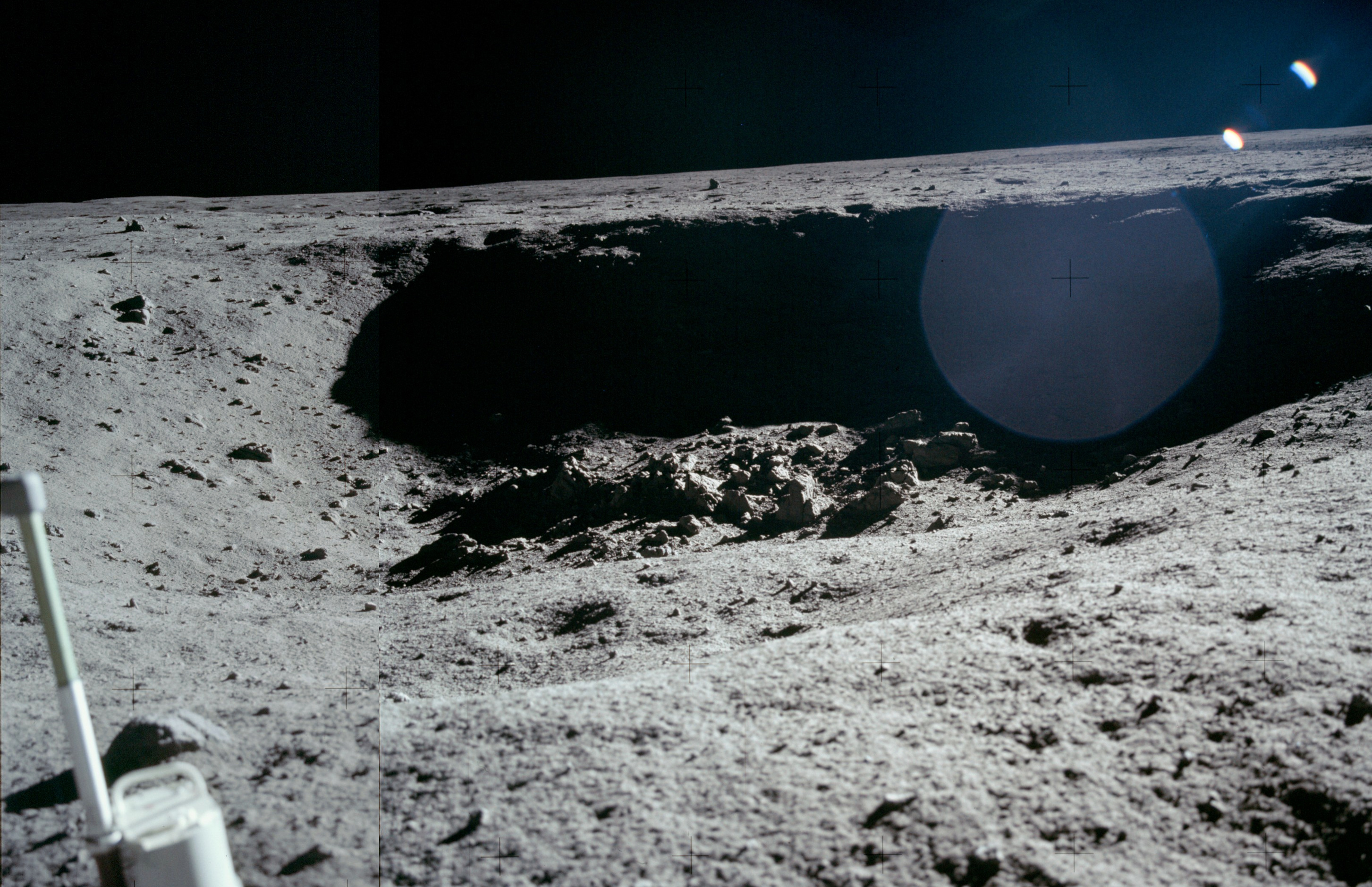
- Composite image of Little West Crater. Photos were taken near the south-west rim of the crater by Neil Armstrong.
- Coordinates: 0.682°N 23.462°E
- Diameter: 30m

Little West is a small crater (30m diameter) in Mare Tranquillitatis on the Moon, east of the Apollo 11 landing site known as Tranquility Base.

The Apollo 11 astronauts Neil Armstrong and Buzz Aldrin landed the Lunar Module (LM) Eagle approximately 60 meters west of Little West Crater on July 20, 1969. This is the crater Neil Armstrong mentions during his final descent onto the lunar surface. The south-west rim of the crater marks the farthest point that either astronaut traveled from the Lunar Module during their time on the lunar surface for the Apollo 11 mission. No visit to a crater had been planned during the landing since there was no expectation that the lander would be near a crater of any size. Armstrong observed some rocks at the center of the crater but didn't enter the crater to sample them.

The crater was named "Little West Crater" because of its proximity along the Lunar Module's flight path to West crater, the far larger, football-field-sized crater of similar name. For some years, Little West Crater was referred to as "East Crater" in the ALSJ (Apollo Lunar Surface Journal) and various derivatives.

At the time of Apollo 11, the words “east” and “west” were used to describe directions on the Moon from the perspective of an observer on Earth. The crater was therefore named “Little West Crater” even though it appears to the east of the landing site on modern Lunar maps.

The name was officially approved by IAU's Working Group for Planetary System Nomenclature on July 26, 2017.

Neil Armstrong's tracks to the crater were visible in images taken by the Lunar Reconnaissance Orbiter in 2009.

== See also ==
- Double crater
