= Command module Columbia =

Command module used for Apollo 11

Columbia
- Part of Apollo 11
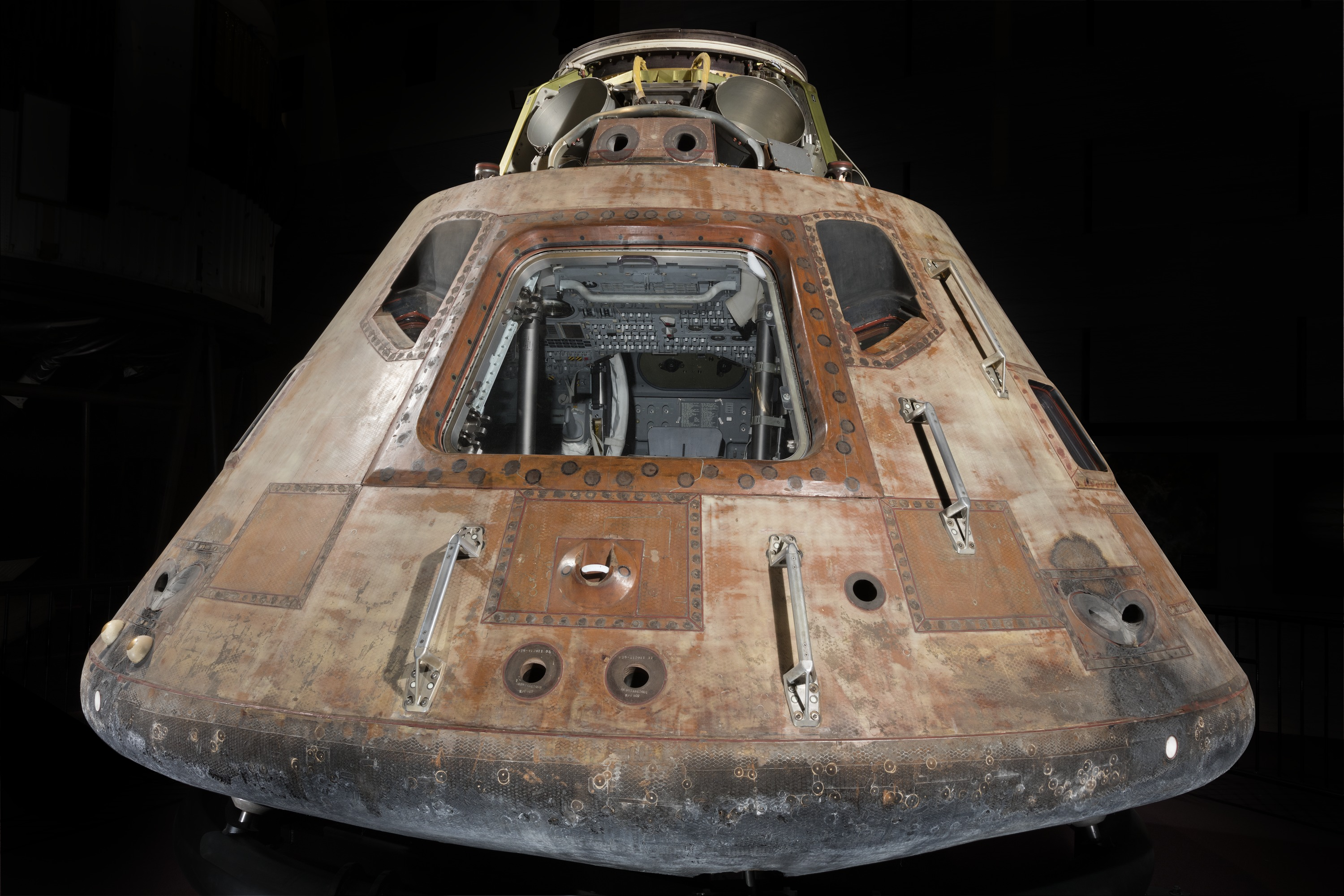
- Columbia on display at the National Air and Space Museum in Washington, D.C.
- Type: Reentry capsule
- Manufacturer: North American Aviation

Command module Columbia (CM-107) is the spacecraft that served as the command module during Apollo 11, which was the first mission to land humans on the Moon. Columbia is the only spacecraft of the 1969 Apollo 11 mission that returned to Earth.

== Name ==
The name Columbia was first suggested to Michael Collins by Julian Scheer, NASA assistant administrator of public affairs during the Apollo program. Scheer mentioned the name, in passing, in a phone conversation, saying "some of us up here have been kicking around Columbia." Collins initially thought it was "a bit pompous" but the name eventually stuck as he could not think of a better alternative and his crewmates Buzz Aldrin and Neil Armstrong had no objections. Collins was also influenced to accept the name because of its similarity to Columbiad, the name of the space gun in Jules Verne's 1865 science fiction novel From the Earth to the Moon.

== Post mission history ==
Following the mission and after a tour of U.S. cities, Columbia was given to the Smithsonian Institution in 1971. It was designated a "Milestone in Flight" and displayed prominently at the National Air and Space Museum in Washington, D.C., alongside the 1903 Wright Flyer.

In July 2016, the Smithsonian released a 3D scan of Columbia produced by the Smithsonian's Digitization Program Office. During the scanning process a number of places where the astronauts had written on the walls of the capsule were found. These included a calendar and a warning about smelly waste on one of the lockers.

In 2019, to commemorate the 50th anniversary of the Apollo 11 landing, the spacecraft traveled around the country on a tour to museums in Houston, St. Louis, Pittsburgh, Seattle, and Cincinnati.

In 2022, Columbia was taken off display as a part of the National Air and Space Museum's renovation. When the museum reopened in the fall of 2022 it became a centerpiece of their new Destination Moon exhibit.

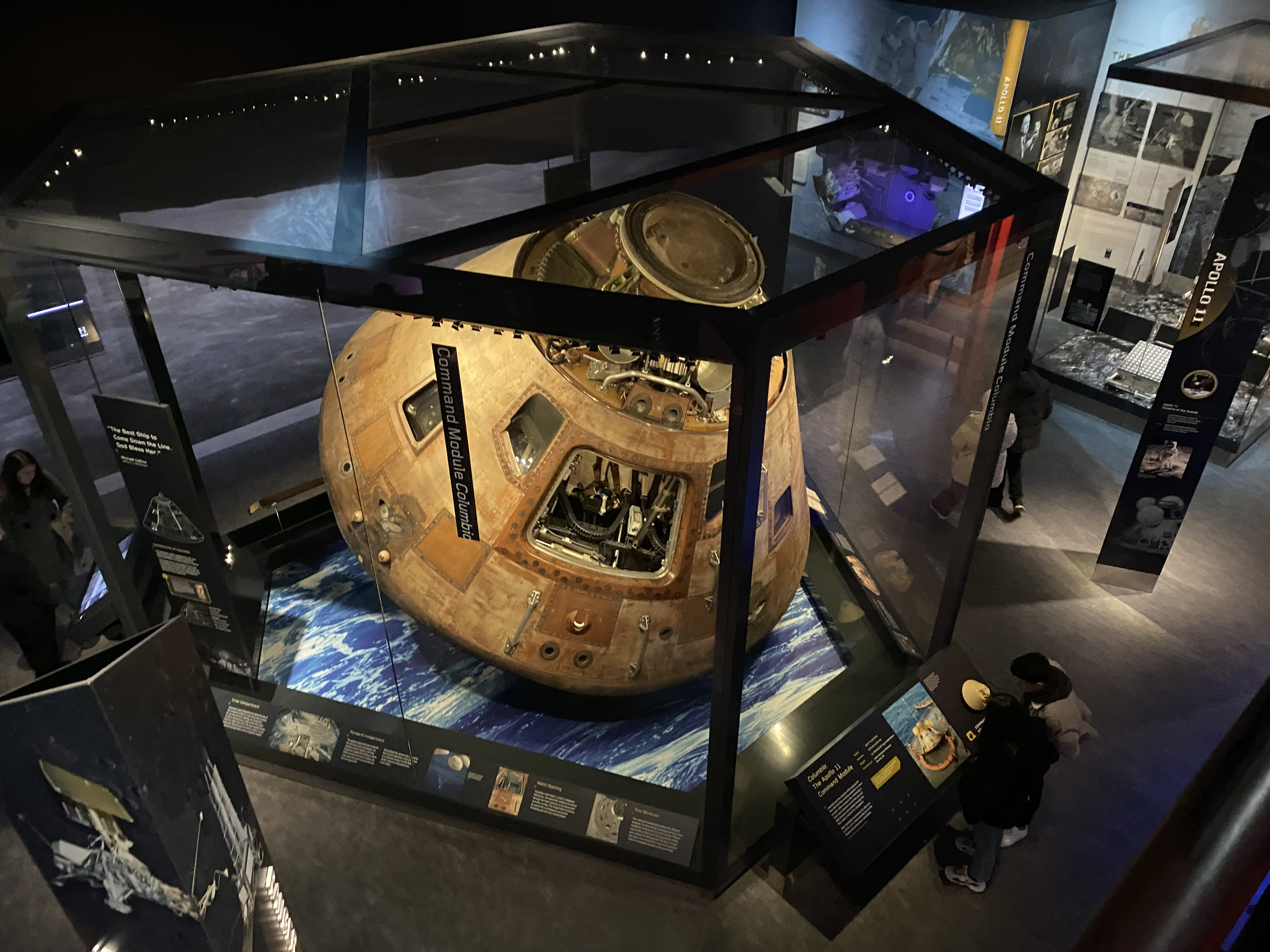
Columbia in its new exhibit on display at the Air and Space Museum in Washington D.C.

Interior of the Command module

== See also ==
- Lunar Module Eagle
