= Ian Hunter (visual effects supervisor) =

Visual effects artist

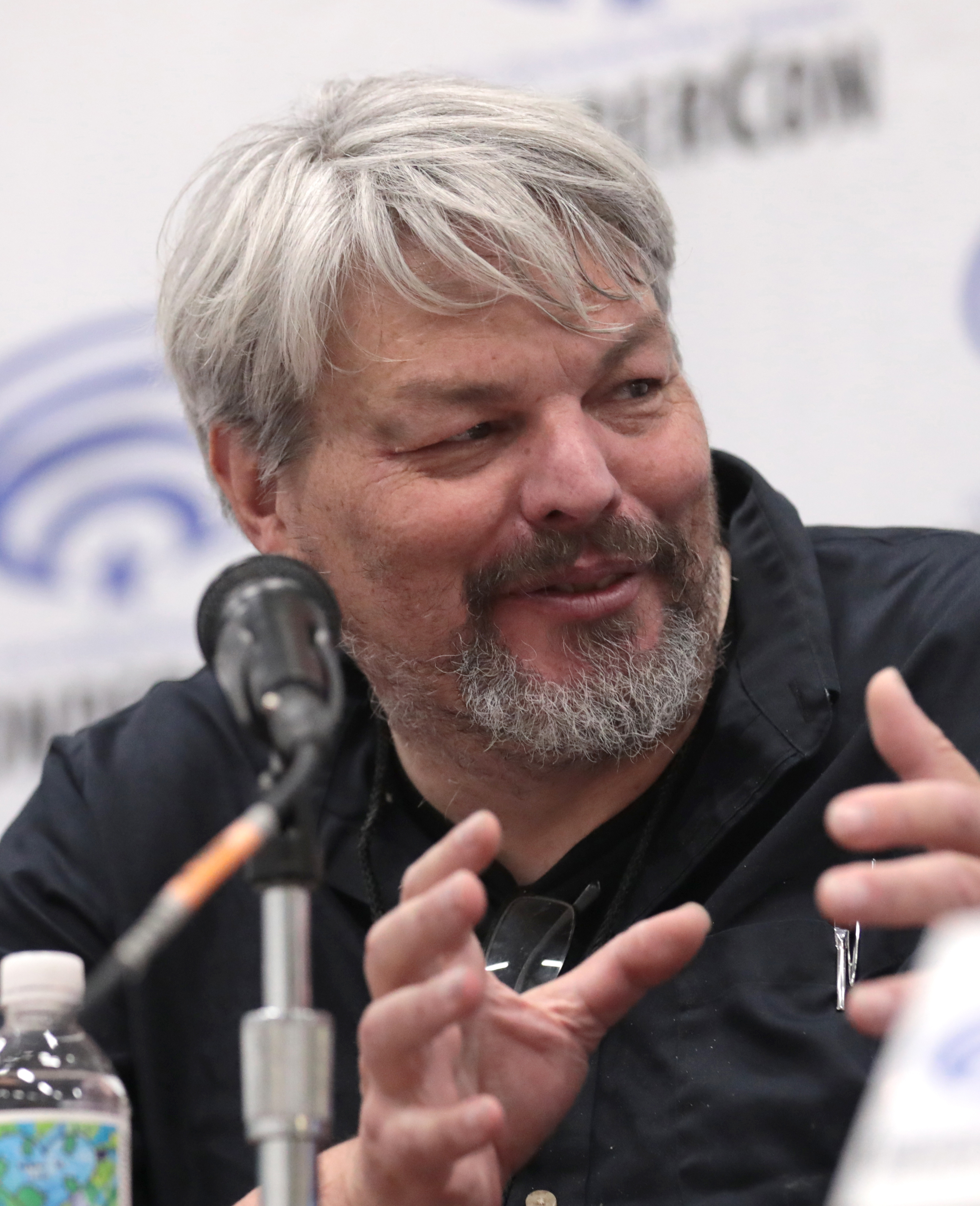
- Hunter at the 2023 WonderCon
- Occupation: Visual effects artist
- Years active: 1982–present

Ian Hunter is a visual effects artist. He won two Academy Awards for Best Visual Effects for the 2014 film, Interstellar, at the 87th Academy Awards in 2015 and for the 2018 film, First Man, at the 91st Academy Awards in 2019.

== Awards ==
Year	Organisation	Work	Category/award	Result	Ref.
2019	91st Academy Awards	First Man	Best Visual Effects	Won	
2015	87th Academy Awards	Interstellar	Best Visual Effects	Won	
2015	68th British Academy Film Awards	Interstellar	Best Special Visual Effects	Won	

== Filmography ==
Year	Title	Role	Notes	Ref(s)
1982	Blade Runner	Visual effects supervisor		
1990	Edward Scissorhands	Miniature maker and consultant		
1992	Batman Returns			
1997	Alien Resurrection	Miniature consultant		
1998	Godzilla	Flatiron and Chrysler modeler	With Matthew Gratzner and Shannon Blake Gans	
2000	Pitch Black	Miniature effects supervisor		
2005	War of the Worlds	Visual effects supervisor		
2008	The Dark Knight	Visual effects supervisor		
2009	2012	Visual effects supervisor		
2010	Inception	Visual effects		
2013	Hansel & Gretel: Witch Hunters	Visual effects supervisor		
2013	Percy Jackson: Sea of Monsters	Visual effects supervisor		
2014	Interstellar	Visual effects		
2014	Kaiju Fury!	Director, writer, and editor		
2010	Resident Evil: Afterlife	Visual effects supervisor		
2018	First Man	Visual effects		
