= Lunar Module Eagle =

Lunar lander used for Apollo 11

Eagle
- Part of Apollo 11
- Eagle at Tranquility Base, July 20, 1969. Neil Armstrong photographs Buzz Aldrin.
- Type: Lunar module
- Class: Apollo Lunar Module
- Manufacturer: Grumman

Specifications
- Launch mass: 33,294.5 lb (15,102.1 kg)

History
- Deployed: July 20, 1969; 57 years ago
- Fate: Ascent stage: Abandoned in lunar orbit; current location unknown; Descent stage: Landed at Tranquility Base; still there

Lunar Module Eagle (LM-5) is the Apollo Lunar Module that was the first crewed lunar lander flown by humans to the Moon. Part of the 1969 Apollo 11 mission, it was named after the bald eagle, which was featured prominently on the mission insignia. It flew from Earth to lunar orbit on the command module Columbia, and then was flown to the Moon on July 20, 1969, by astronaut Neil Armstrong with navigational assistance from Buzz Aldrin. Eagle's landing created Tranquility Base, named by Armstrong and Aldrin and first announced upon the module's touchdown.

The name of the craft gave rise to the phrase "The Eagle has landed", the words Armstrong said upon Eagle's touchdown.

== Flight ==
Eagle was launched with Command Module Columbia on July 16, 1969, atop a Saturn V launch vehicle from Launch Complex 39A, and entered Earth orbit 12 minutes later. Eagle entered lunar orbit on July 19, 1969. On July 20, Neil Armstrong and Buzz Aldrin entered into the LM and separated it from Command Module Columbia. Eagle was landed at Tranquility Base at 20:17:40 UTC on July 20, 1969, with 216 pounds (98 kg) of usable fuel remaining. After the lunar surface operations, Armstrong and Aldrin returned to the Lunar Module Eagle on July 21, 1969. At 17:54:00 UTC, they lifted off in Eagle's ascent stage to rejoin Michael Collins aboard Columbia in lunar orbit.

After the crew re-boarded Columbia, the Eagle ascent stage was abandoned in lunar orbit. The location of its impact on the Moon's surface during an orbit decay is unknown. Studies of Eagle's estimated orbital trajectory have suggested that the spacecraft may still be in orbit as of 2021.

== Gallery ==
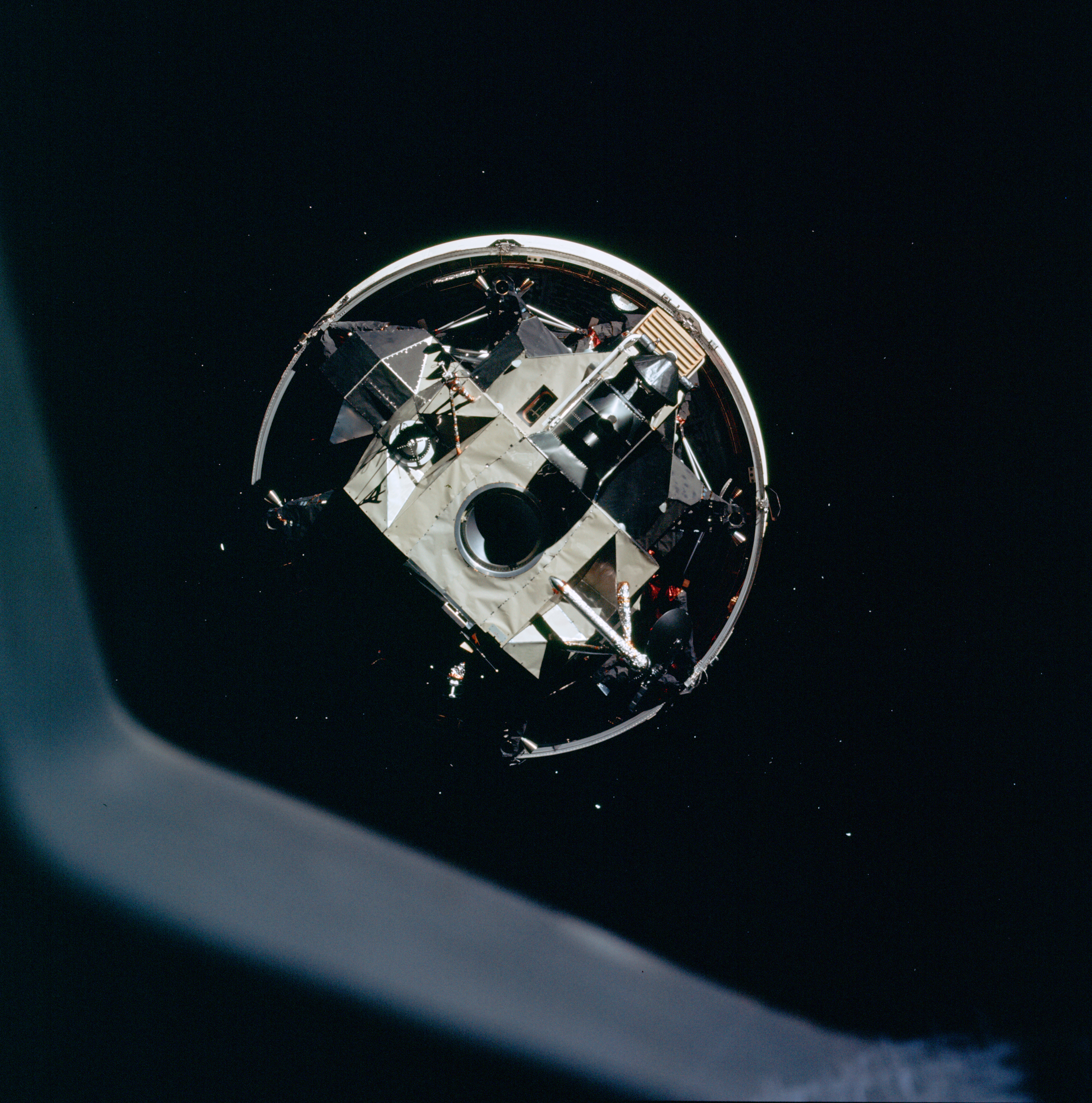
Lunar Module Eagle prior to extraction from S-IVB stage on July 16, 1969

Neil Armstrong and Buzz Aldrin land the Lunar Module Eagle on the Moon on July 20, 1969

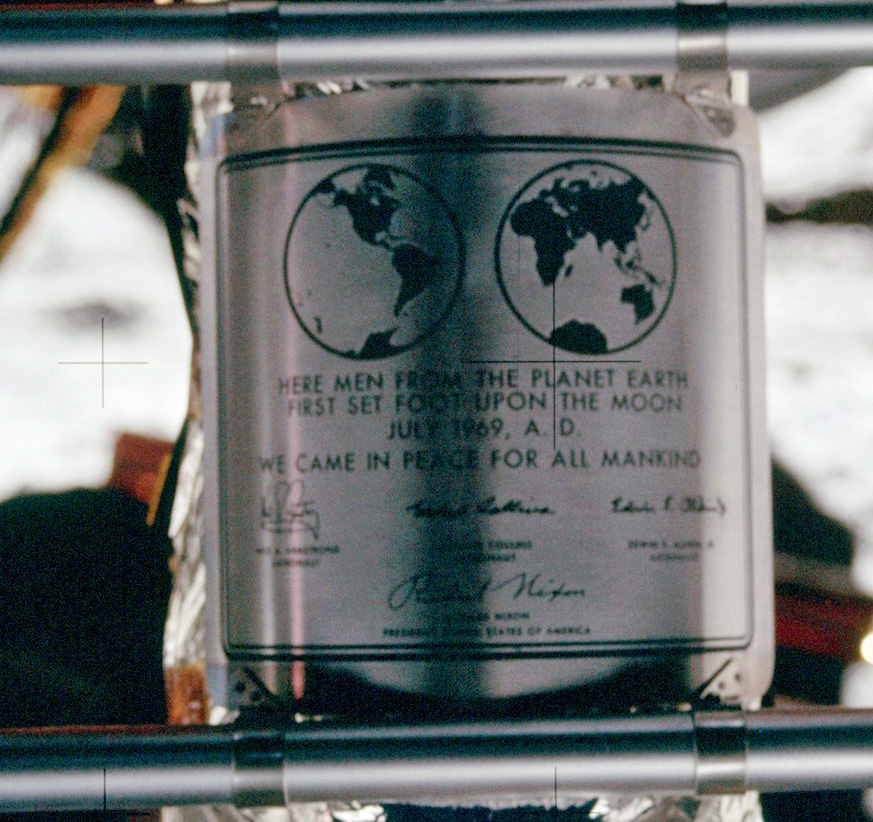
The plaque left on the ladder of Eagle

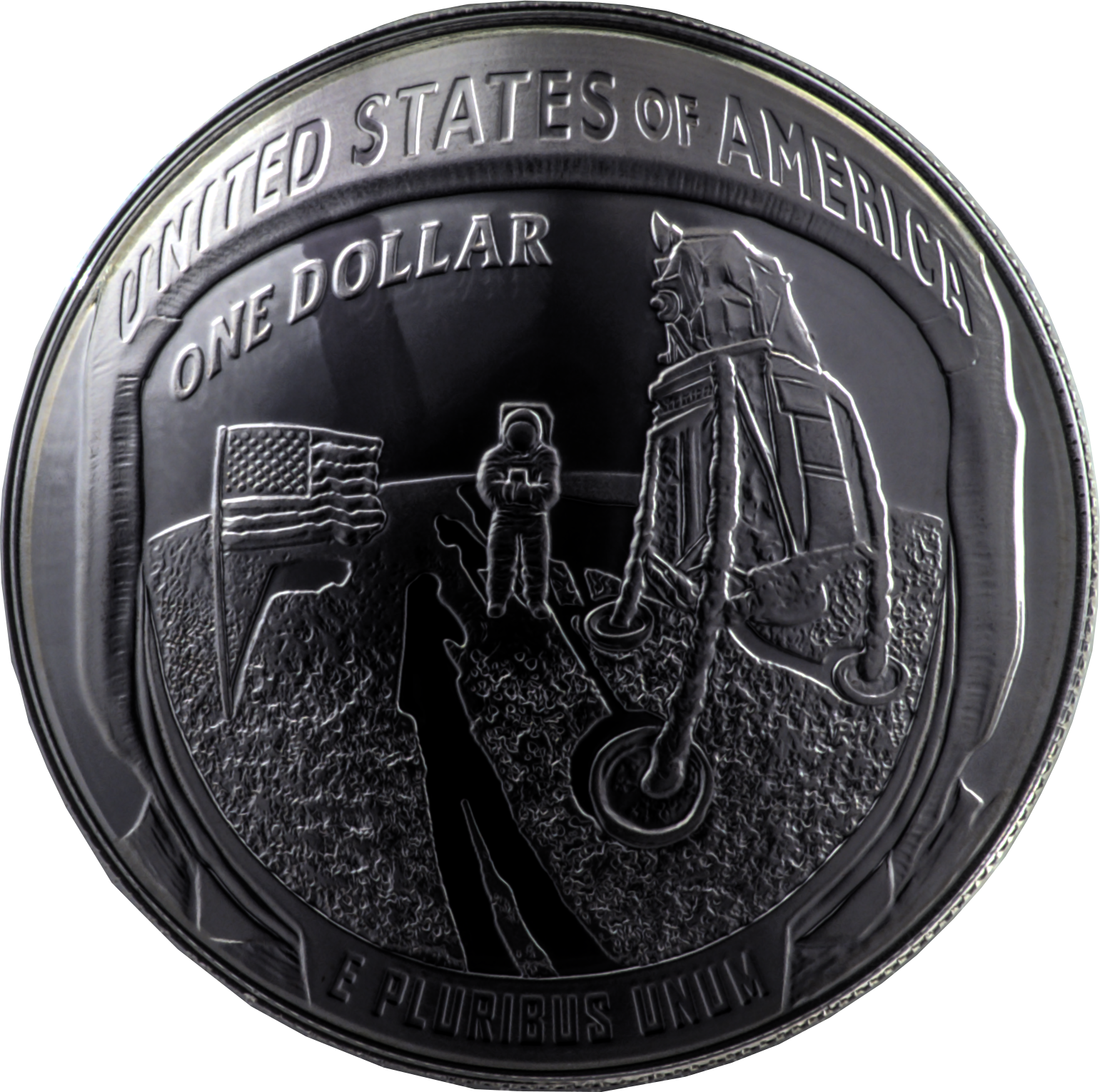
Apollo 11 50th Anniversary commemorative silver dollar depicting Eagle

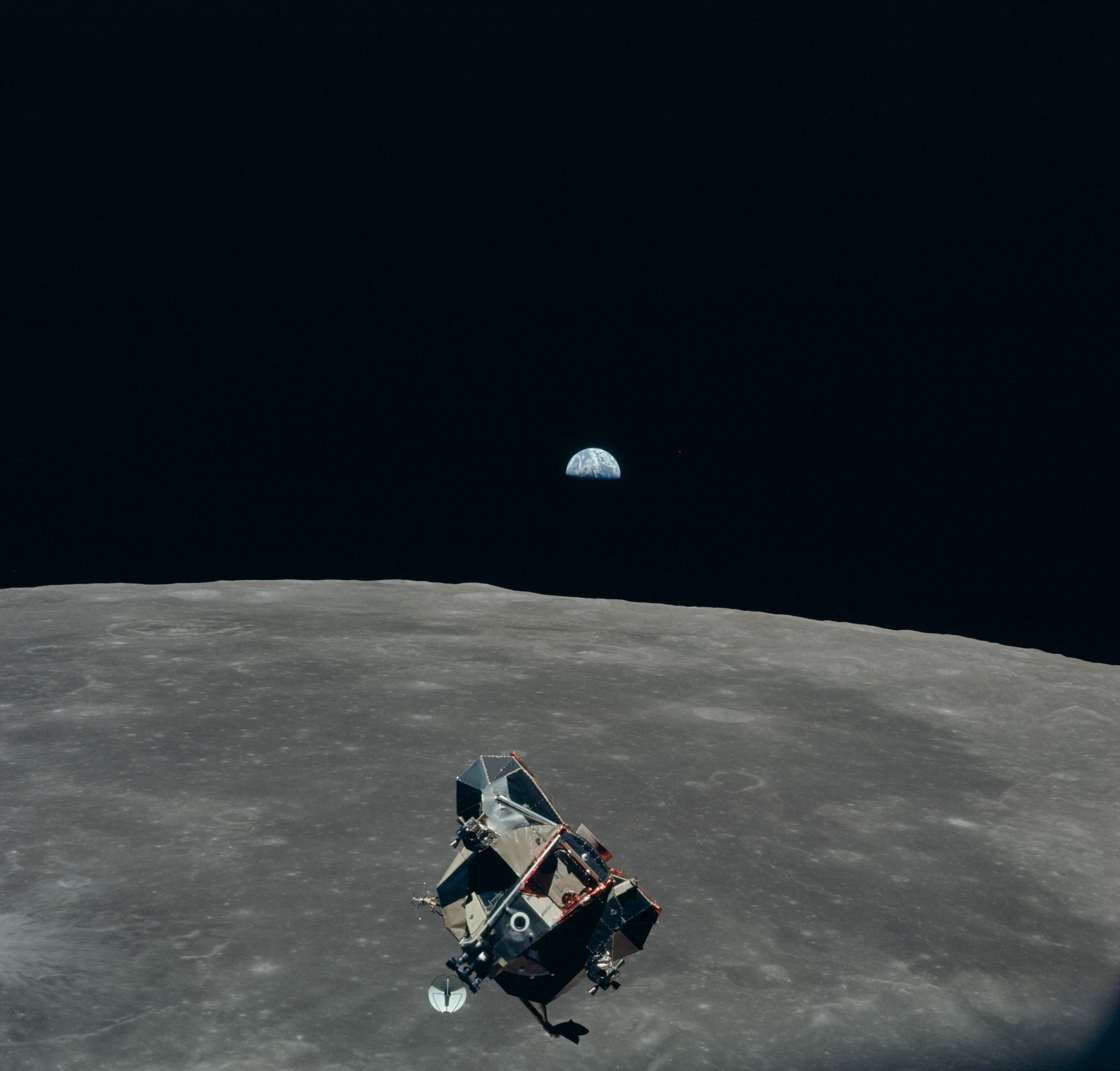
Image of Eagle by Michael Collins from Command Module Columbia

== See also ==
- List of artificial objects on the Moon
- List of crewed lunar landers
