= Apollo PGNCS =

Apollo spacecraft guidance system

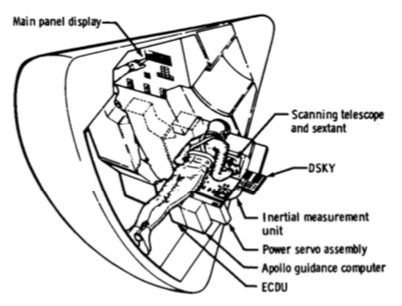
Apollo Command Module primary guidance system components

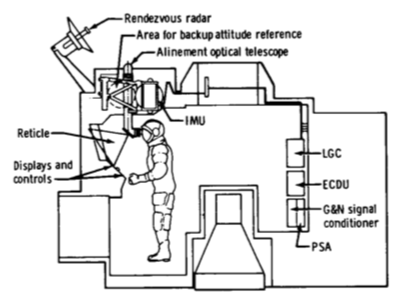
Apollo Lunar Module primary guidance system components

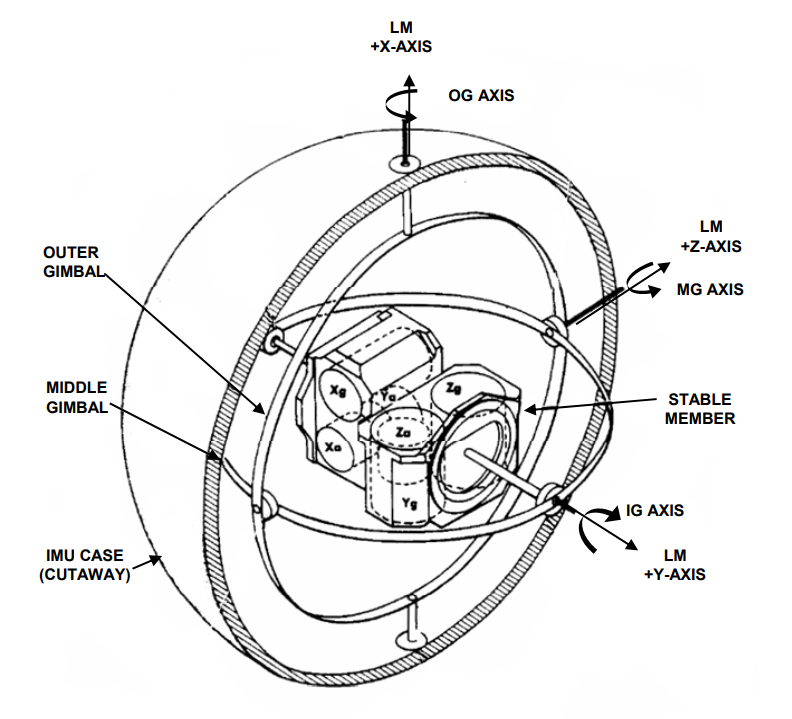
Apollo Inertial Measurement Unit

The Apollo primary guidance, navigation, and control system (PGNCS, pronounced pings) was a self-contained inertial guidance system that allowed Apollo spacecraft to carry out their missions when communications with Earth were interrupted, either as expected, when the spacecraft were behind the Moon, or in case of a communications failure. The Apollo command module (CM) and lunar module (LM) each carried a version of PGNCS. PGNCS, and specifically its computer, also served as the command centre for all system inputs from the CM and the LM, including the optical units, the radar system, the manual translation and rotation device inputs by the astronauts, and other inputs from the CM and LM systems.

The MIT Instrumentation Laboratory developed PGNCS under the direction of Charles Stark Draper (the Instrumentation Laboratory was later named after him). The prime contractor for PGNCS and manufacturer of the inertial measurement unit (IMU) was the Delco Division of General Motors. PGNCS consisted of the following components:

- an inertial measurement unit (IMU)
- the Apollo Guidance Computer (AGC)
- resolvers to convert inertial platform angles to signals usable for servo control
- optical units, a Space Sextant for the CM and an Alignment Optical Telescope for the LM
- a mechanical frame, called the navigation base (or navbase), to rigidly connect the optical devices and, in the LM, the rendezvous radar to the IMU
- the AGC software

== Versions ==
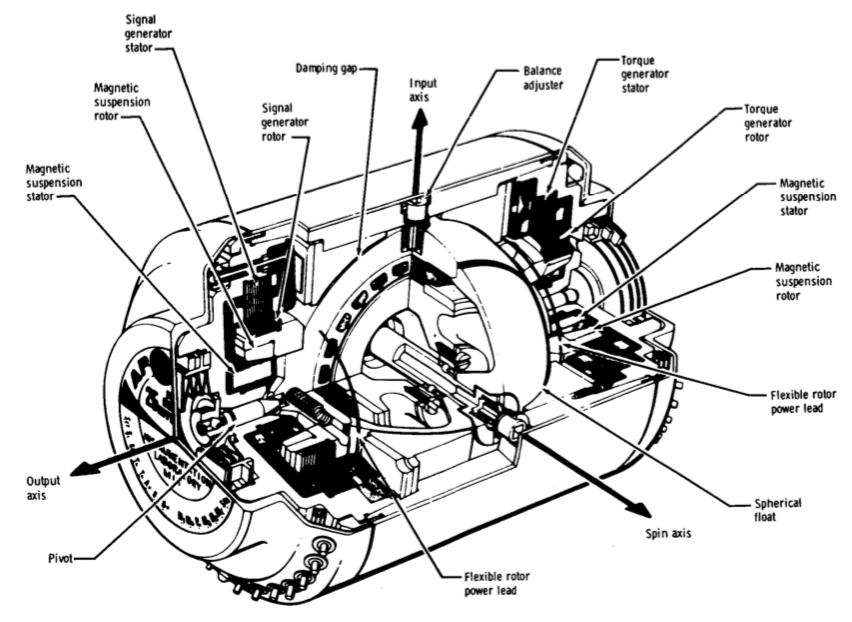
Apollo gyroscope (IRIG)

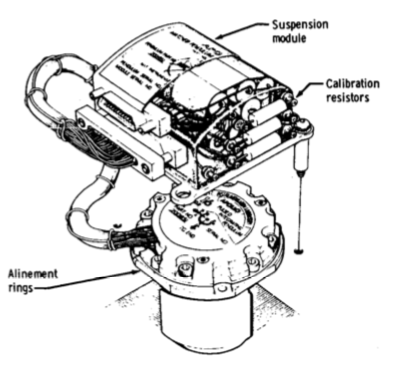
Apollo accelerometer (PIPA)

The CM and LM used the same computer, inertial platform and resolvers. The main difference was the optical unit. Each spacecraft also had a different navbase, reflecting their different mounting geometries. The LM's rendezvous radar was also connected to its navbase.

PGNCS had two versions—Block I and Block II—corresponding to the two generations of the CM. After the Apollo 1 fire, which occurred in a Block I CM, NASA decided that no further crewed missions would use Block I, though uncrewed missions did. Major differences between Block I and Block II PGNCS included replacing electromechanical resolvers with an all-electronic design and replacing the Block I navbase, which was machined from beryllium, with a frame built out of aluminium tubing filled with polyurethane foam. The Block II navbases were lighter, cheaper, and just as rigid.

Another major difference between Block I and Block II was repairability. An original goal of the Apollo program was for astronauts to be able to repair the electronics. Accordingly, the Block 1 PNGCS was designed with many identical modules that could be replaced with spares, if necessary, in flight. However, high humidity inside the crew compartments and accidents involving handling body fluids during the Gemini 7 mission made unsealed electrical connections undesirable. The repairability goal was eliminated in Block II, and all units and electrical connections were sealed. The fatal Apollo 1 fire reinforced this concern.

== Inertial measurement unit ==
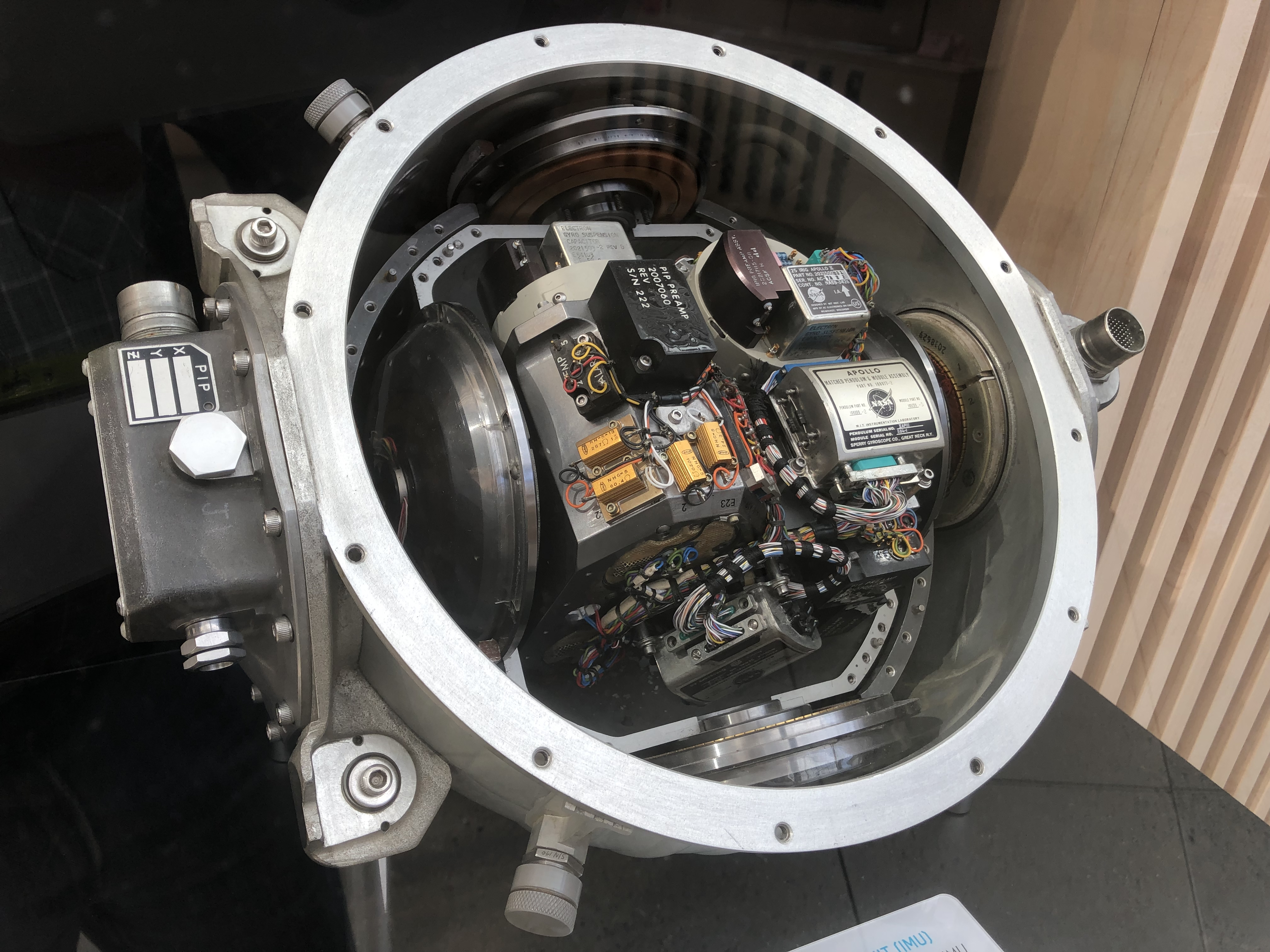
Apollo IMU

The IMU was gimbaled on three axes. The innermost part, the stable member (SM), was a 6-inch beryllium cube, with three gyroscopes and three accelerometers mounted in it. Feedback loops used signals from the gyroscopes by way of the resolvers to control motors at each axis. This servo system kept the stable member fixed with respect to inertial space. Signals from the accelerometers were then integrated to keep track of the spacecraft's velocity and position. The IMU was derived from the guidance system Draper developed for the Polaris missile.

== Optical units ==
Inertial guidance systems are not perfect, and the Apollo system drifted about one milliradian per hour. Thus, it was necessary to realign the inertial platform periodically by sighting on stars.

=== Space sextant ===
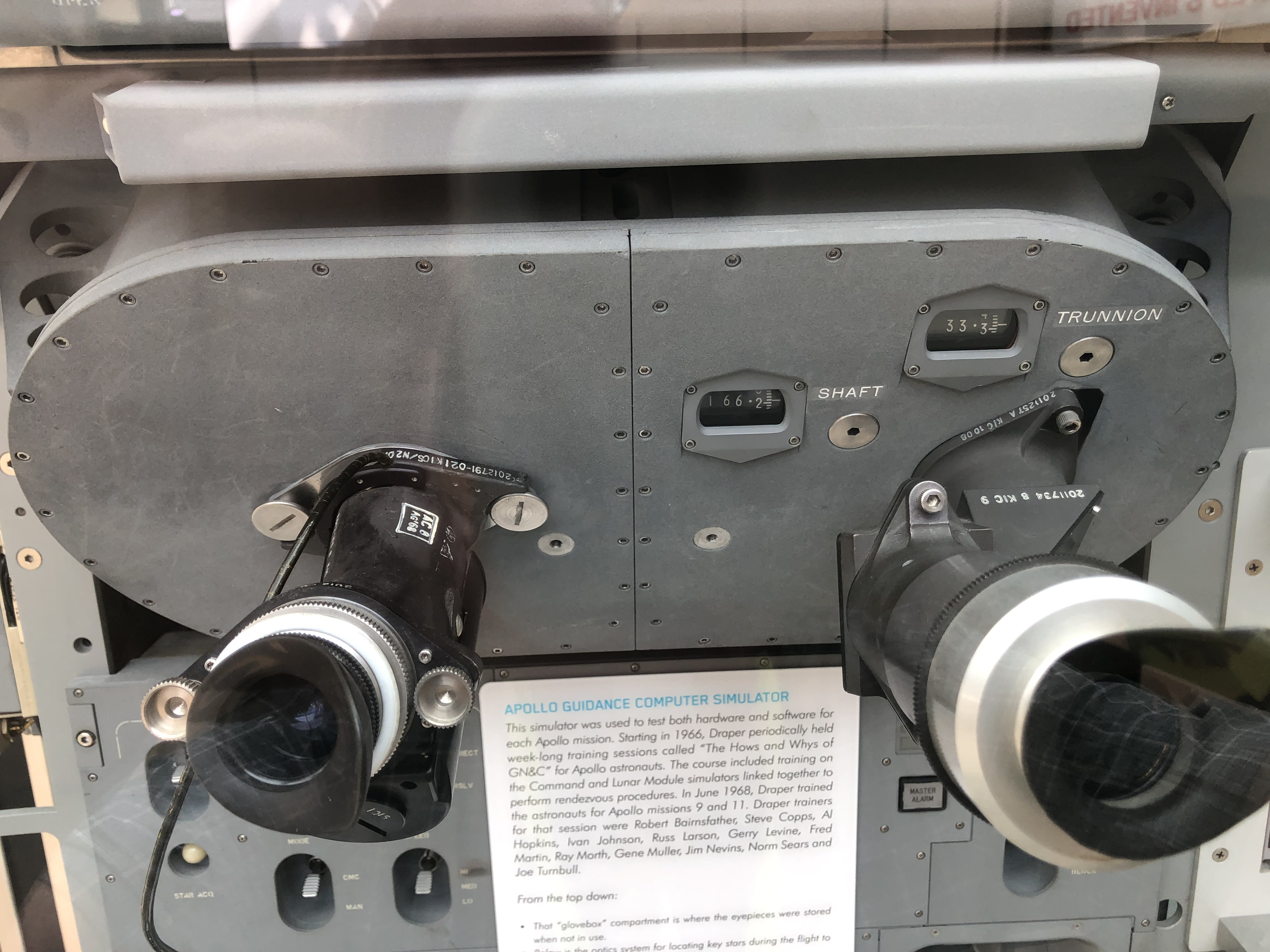
CM space sextant

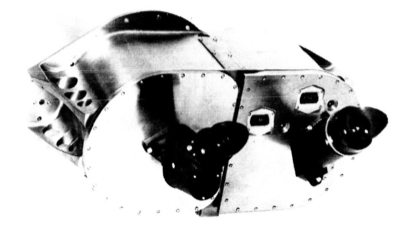
Apollo CM optical unit

The CM optical unit had a precision sextant (SXT) fixed to the IMU frame that measured angles between stars and Earth or Moon landmarks, or the horizon. It had two lines of sight, 28× magnification and a 1.8° field of view. The optical unit also included a low-magnification, wide-field-of-view (60°) scanning telescope (SCT) for star sightings. The optical unit could be used to determine CM position and orientation in space.

=== Alignment Optical Telescope ===
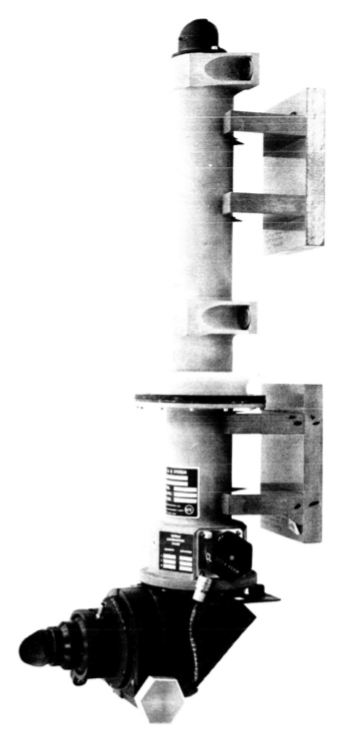
Lunar Module's Alignment Optical Telescope (AOT)

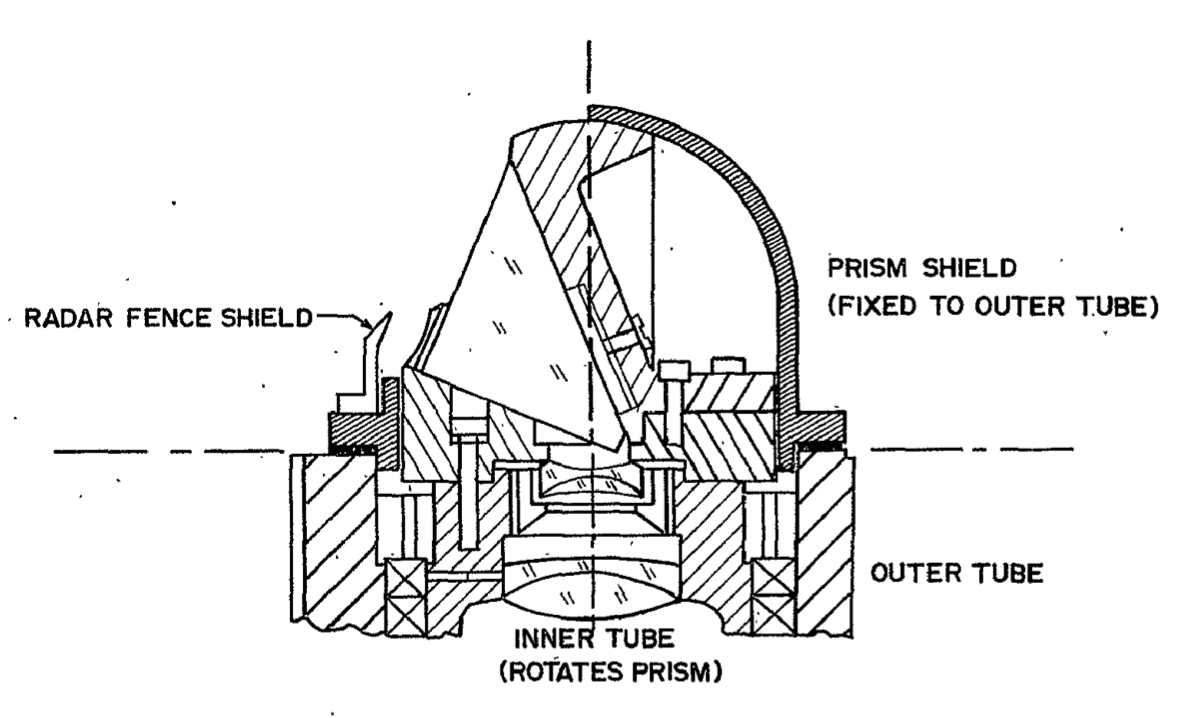
Cross section of AOT's outer end with rotatable prism, before addition of sun shade

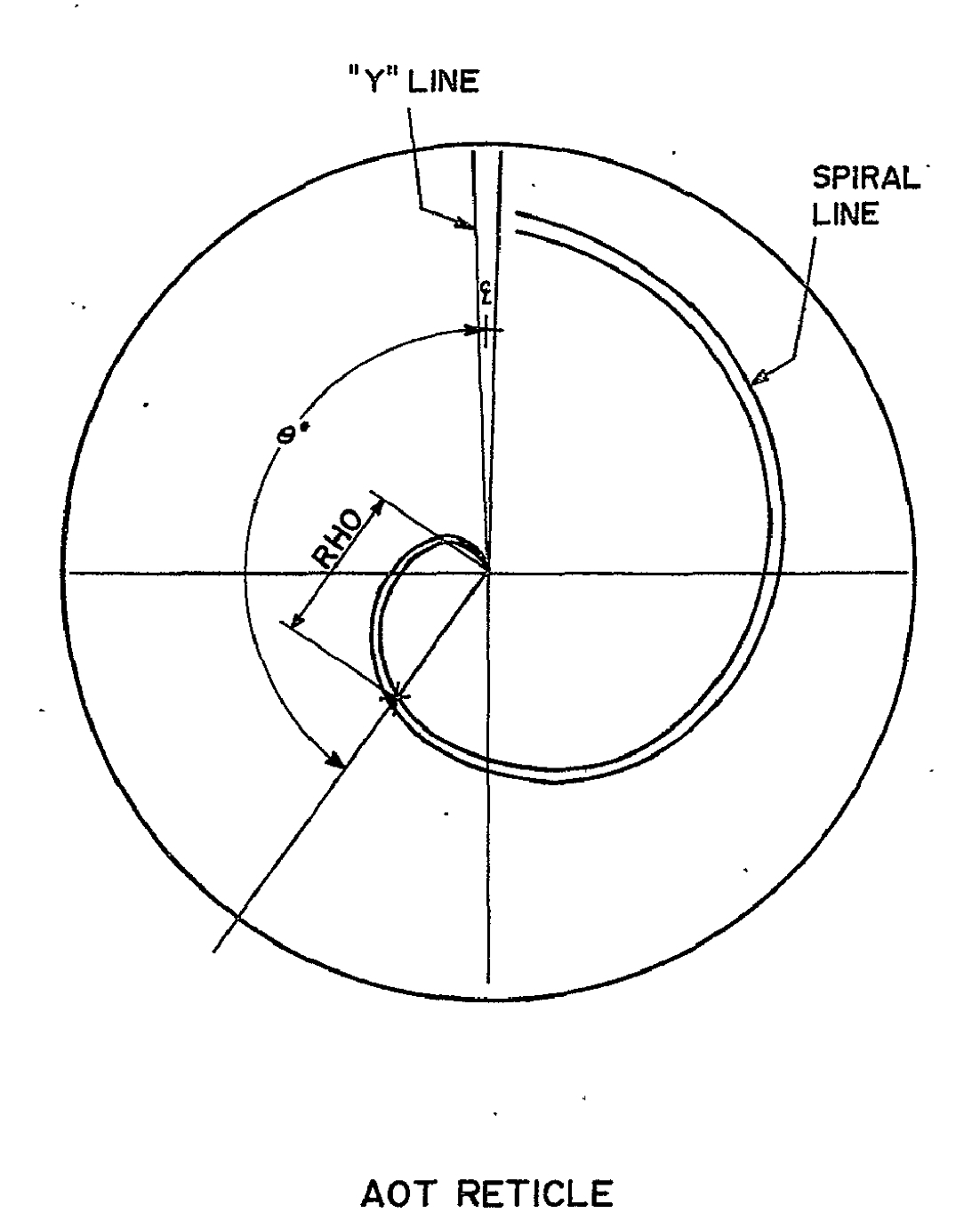
Reticle used in the AOT to allow star position measurement

The LM had an Alignment Optical Telescope (AOT), which was essentially a periscope, with no magnification. The outer element of the AOT was a sun-shielded prism that could be rotated to one of six fixed positions in order to cover a large portion of the sky. Each position had a 60° field of view. The AOT had a reticle in its optical path that a crew member could rotate. The reticle had two doubled lines on it, a radius and an Archimedean spiral. The crew member would select a star he could see through the AOT and enter its ID into the DSKY. He would then rotate the reticle, pressing a button when the star was within each doubled line. The AGC could read the reticle's angle. The two reticle measurements determined the star's position in the AOT's field of view. By doing this procedure with two different stars, the computer could determine the craft's orientation.

The sun shade was added late in the program, in 1967, after tests and modelling showed that astronauts might not be able to see stars on the lunar surface because direct sunlight or light scattered by nearby parts of the LM impinged on the outside prism. Adding the sun shade also allowed increasing the number of view positions from three to six.

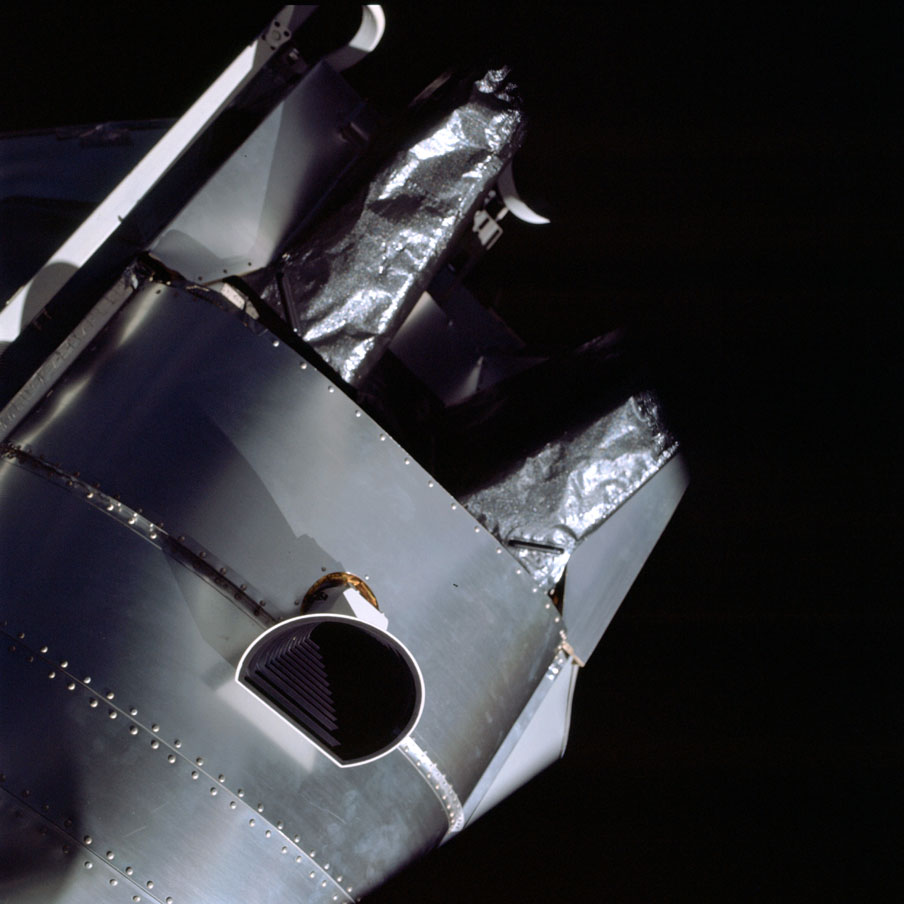
AOT sun shade on Apollo 9 Lunar Module

Apollo 11 Command Module Pilot Michael Collins noted that the visibility through the optics was sub-standard, and it was difficult to see through in certain lighting conditions.

== Software ==
The onboard guidance software used a Kalman filter to merge new data with past position measurements to produce an optimal position estimate for the spacecraft. The key information was a coordinate transformation between the IMU stable member and the reference coordinate system. In Apollo argot, this matrix was known as REFSMMAT ("Reference to Stable Member Matrix"). Two reference coordinate systems were used, depending on the mission phase: one centred on Earth and one centred on the Moon.

== Navigational information ==
Despite the word "primary" in its name, PGNCS data was not the main source of navigation information. Computers at Mission Control processed tracking data from NASA's Deep Space Network using least squares algorithms. The resulting position and velocity estimates were more accurate than those produced by PGNCS. As a result, the astronauts were periodically given state vector updates to enter into the AGC, based on ground data. PGNCS remained essential for maintaining spacecraft orientation, controlling rockets during manoeuvring burns (including lunar landing and takeoff), and serving as the primary source of navigation data during planned and unexpected communications outages. PGNCS also checked ground data.

The lunar module had a third means of navigation, the abort guidance system (AGS), built by TRW. This was to be used in the event of a PGNCS failure. The AGS could be used to take off from the Moon and to rendezvous with the Command Module, but not for landing. During Apollo 13, after the most critical burn near the Moon, the AGS was used in place of PGNCS because it required less electrical power and cooling water.

== Apollo 11 ==
During the Apollo 11 mission, two PGNCS alarms (1201 "No VAC areas available" and 1202 "Executive alarm, no core sets") were relayed to mission control as the first lunar landing was being attempted on July 20, 1969. The computer system overload was caused by the simultaneous capture of landing radar data and rendezvous radar data. Support staff at Mission control concluded that the alarms could be safely ignored and the landing succeeded.

== See also ==
- Saturn V instrument unit − guidance system used by the Apollo launch vehicles
