= REFSMMAT =

Space flight term

REFSMMAT is a term used by guidance, navigation, and control system flight controllers during the Apollo program, which carried over into the Space Shuttle program. REFSMMAT stands for "Reference to Stable Member Matrix". It is a numerical definition of a fixed orientation in space and is usually (but not always) defined with respect to the stars. It was used by the Apollo Primary Guidance, Navigation and Control System (PGNCS) as a reference to which the gimbal-mounted platform at its core should be oriented. Every operation within the spacecraft that required knowledge of direction was carried out with respect to the orientation of the guidance platform, itself aligned according to a particular REFSMMAT.

During an Apollo flight, the REFSMMAT being used, and therefore the orientation of the guidance platform, would change as operational needs required it, but never during a guidance process—that is, one REFSMMAT might be in use from launch through Trans-Lunar Injection, another from TLI to Midpoint, but would not change during the middle of a burn or set of maneuvers.

One consideration in choosing each respective REFSMMAT was to avoid taking the spacecraft near the gimbal lock zone of its Inertial Measurement Unit during any expected spacecraft maneuvers, since the exact orientation of the "forbidden" range of spacecraft attitudes would depend on the current REFSMMAT.

Additionally, it was considered good practice to have the spacecraft displays show some meaningful attitude value that would be easy to monitor during an important engine burn. Flight controllers at mission control in Houston would calculate what attitude the spacecraft had to be at for that burn and would devise a REFSMMAT that matched it in some way. Then, when it came time for the burn, if the spacecraft was in its correct attitude, the crew would see their 8-ball display a simple attitude that would be easy to interpret, allowing errors to be easily tracked and corrected.

In the hallowed halls of mission control, Captain Refsmmat was a Kilroy-type character, conceived as a joke spoken to a 'Flight Dynamics Branch' rookie by Flight Controller RETRO John Llewellyn, and first drawn by flight controller FIDO Edward Louis Pavelka Jr. as the "ideal mission controller". 'Capt. Refsmmat' served during the Apollo and Skylab years as an aid to the esprit de corps within the mission control team.

== See also ==
- Apollo program
