= Margaret Hamilton (software engineer) =

American software engineer (1936–2026)

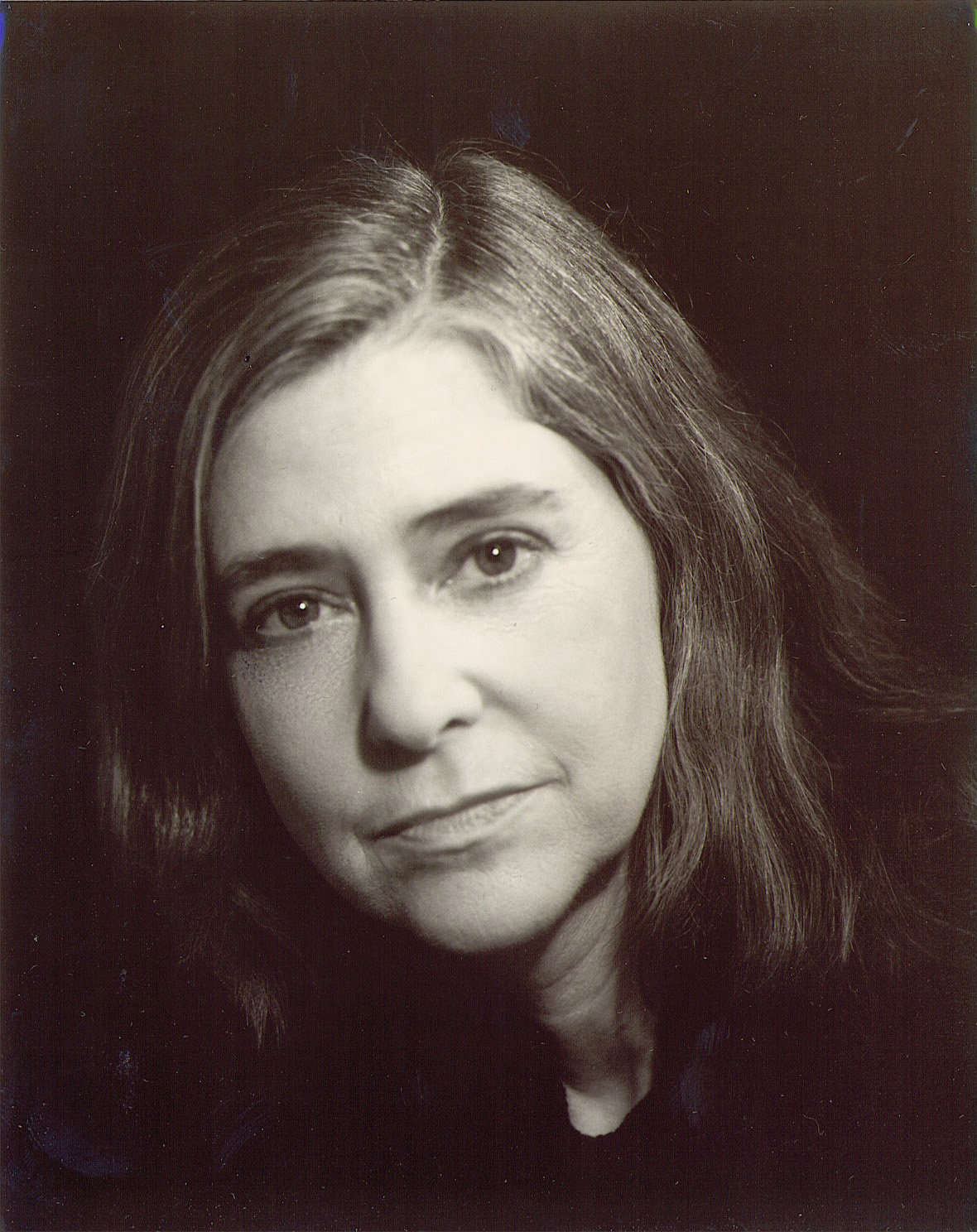
- Hamilton in 1995
- Born: Margaret Elaine Heafield; August 17, 1936; Paoli, Indiana, U.S.
- Died: September 30, 2026 (aged 90); Cambridge, Massachusetts, U.S.
- Education: University of Michigan (attended); Earlham College (BA)
- Spouses: James Cox Hamilton (m. 1958; div. 1967); Dan Lickly (m. 1969; div. 1970)
- Children: 1
- Relatives: James Cox Chambers (former son-in-law); Fergie Chambers (grandson)
- Awards: Presidential Medal of Freedom (2016)

Margaret Elaine Hamilton (née Heafield; August 17, 1936 – September 30, 2026) was an American computer scientist. She directed the Software Engineering Division at the MIT Instrumentation Laboratory, where she led the development of the on-board flight software for NASA's Apollo Guidance Computer for the Apollo program. She later founded the software companies Higher Order Software in 1976 and Hamilton Technologies in 1986 — both in Cambridge, Massachusetts.

Hamilton published more than 130 papers, proceedings, and reports, about sixty projects, and six major programs. She coined the term software engineering, stating, "I began to use the term 'software engineering' to distinguish it from hardware and other kinds of engineering, yet treat each type of engineering as part of the overall systems engineering process."

On November 22, 2016, Hamilton received the Presidential Medal of Freedom from President Barack Obama for her work leading to the development of on-board flight software for NASA's Apollo moon missions.

== Early life and education ==
Margaret Heafield was born on August 17, 1936, in Paoli, Indiana, to Kenneth Heafield and Ruth Esther Heafield (née Partington). The family later moved to the Upper Peninsula of Michigan, and Margaret graduated from Hancock High School in 1954.

She studied mathematics at the University of Michigan in 1955 before transferring to Earlham College in Indiana, where her mother had been a student. She earned a Bachelor of Arts (BA) degree in mathematics with a minor in philosophy in 1958. She cited Florence Long, the head of the math department at Earlham, as helping with her desire to pursue abstract mathematics and become a mathematics professor. She said her poet father and headmaster grandfather inspired her to include a minor in philosophy in her studies.

== Career ==
In Boston, Hamilton initially intended to enroll in graduate study in abstract mathematics at Brandeis University. However, in mid-1959, Hamilton began working for Edward Norton Lorenz, in the meteorology department at Massachusetts Institute of Technology (MIT). She developed software for predicting weather, programming on the LGP-30 and the PDP-1 computers at Marvin Minsky's Project MAC. Her work contributed to Lorenz's future publications on chaos theory, as acknowledged by Lorenz himself. At the time, computer science and software engineering were not yet established disciplines; instead, programmers learned on the job with hands-on experience. She moved on to another project in the summer of 1961, and hired and trained Ellen Fetter as her replacement.

=== SAGE Project ===
From 1961 to 1963, Hamilton worked on the Semi-Automatic Ground Environment (SAGE) Project at the MIT Lincoln Lab, where she was one of the programmers who wrote software for the prototype AN/FSQ-7 computer (the XD-1), used by the U.S. Air Force to search for possibly unfriendly aircraft. She also wrote software for a satellite tracking project at the Air Force Cambridge Research Laboratories. The SAGE Project was an extension of Project Whirlwind, started by MIT to create a computer system that could be used as a flight simulator. By September 1951, SAGE had been modified to serve military purposes more directly, and Whirlwind computers had been repurposed for use with radar systems in air defense.

Hamilton said of her work on SAGE:

What they used to do when you came into this organization as a beginner, was to assign you this program which nobody was able to ever figure out or get to run. When I was the beginner they gave it to me as well. And what had happened was it was tricky programming, and the person who wrote it took delight in the fact that all of his comments were in Greek and Latin. So I was assigned this program and I actually got it to work. It even printed out its answers in Latin and Greek. I was the first one to get it to work.

Hamilton also recalled that it was while working on SAGE that she began to understand the importance of software quality, particularly software stability. A program crash would trigger an alarm visible to other programmers and SAGE system operators.

=== MIT Instrumentation Laboratory and the Apollo Guidance Computer ===
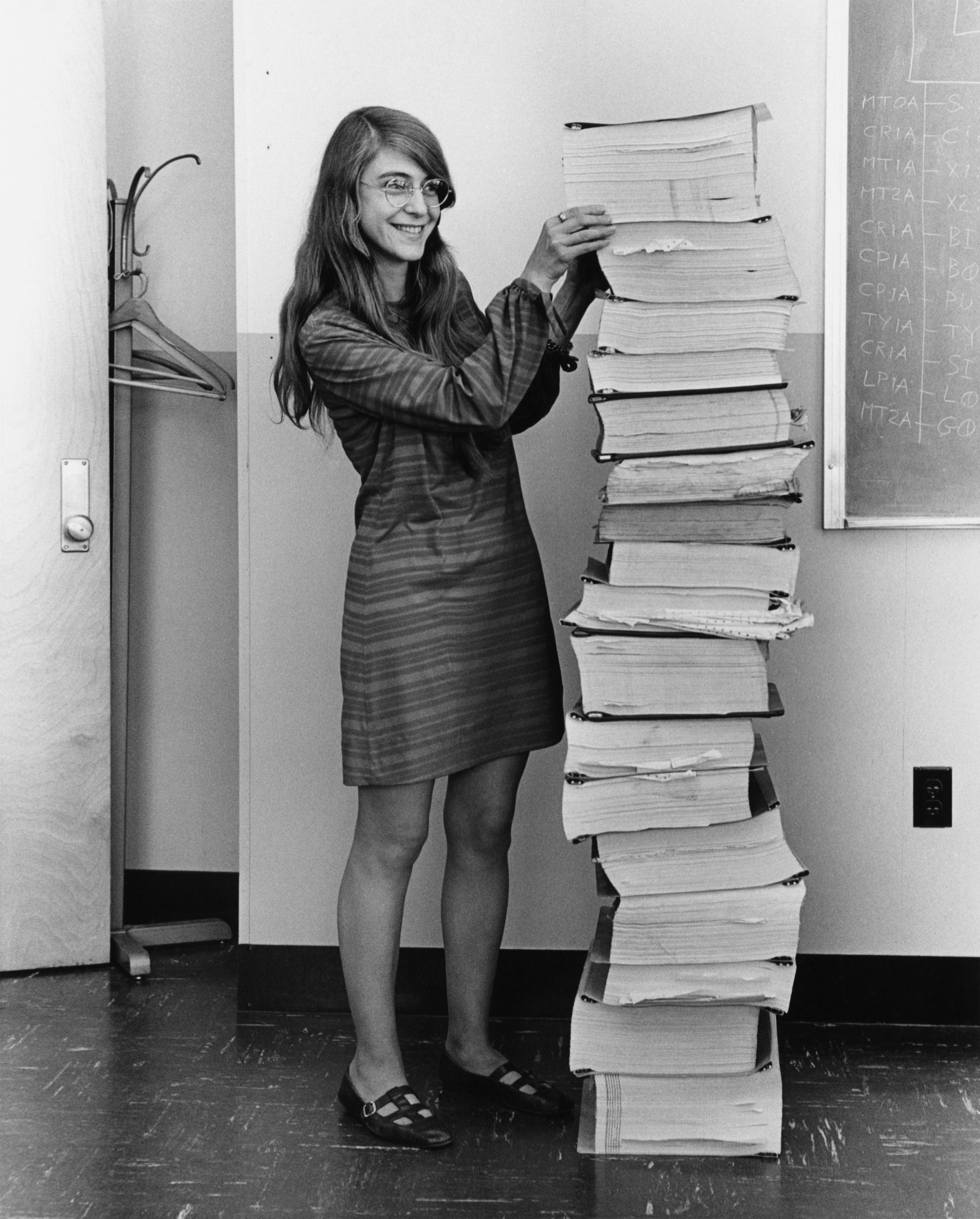
Hamilton in 1969, standing next to listings of the Apollo guidance software she and her MIT team produced

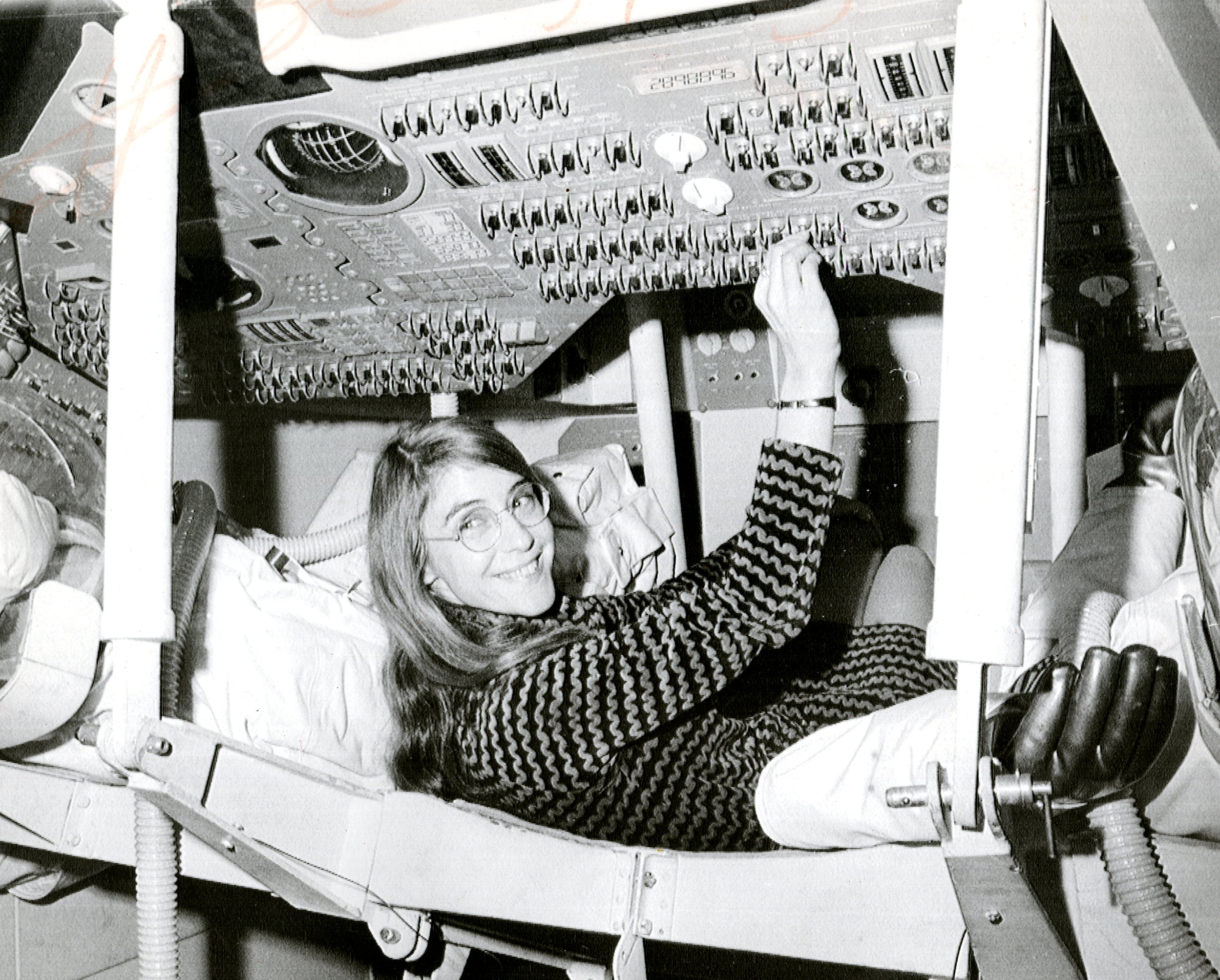
Hamilton during her time as lead Apollo flight software designer

Hamilton learned of the Apollo project in 1965 and wanted to get involved due to it being "very exciting" as a Moon program. She joined the MIT Instrumentation Laboratory, which developed the Apollo Guidance Computer for the Apollo lunar exploration program. Hamilton was initially hired as a programmer for this process but moved on into systems design.

Her first program for the Apollo mission involved lunar landmark tables for an unmanned mission to the Moon. After the mission had already launched, it was discovered that the tables had been entered in reverse order. Nevertheless, the mission was ultimately successful.

Hamilton recalled that during the next mission, she was still treated as a novice programmer. She believed this was why she had been assigned to write a contingency program that was never expected to be executed. She even named the program "Forget It". However, the program proved crucial when the unlikely scenario actually occurred. Hamilton became the mission expert, and control was handed over to "Forget It".

With time she became Director of the new Software Engineering Division. She was responsible for the team writing and testing all onboard in-flight software for the Apollo spacecraft's Command and Lunar Module and for the subsequent Skylab space station. Another part of her team designed and developed the systems software. This included error detection and recovery software such as restarts and the Display Interface Routines (also known as the Priority Displays), which Hamilton designed and developed. She worked to gain hands-on experience during a time when computer science courses were uncommon and software engineering courses did not exist.

Olivier de Weck, the Apollo Program Professor at MIT, later called Hamilton "a pioneer" in the new field of software engineering and "a fundamental contributor" to the Apollo program. He added that she not only was an advanced systems programmer in her own right, but also headed a team that developed "one of the most complex systems humanity had ever achieved".

==== Apollo 11 landing ====
In one of the critical moments of the Apollo 11 mission, the lunar module's guidance computer, (Note: Apollo 11 carried two nearly identical guidance computers, one each for its command module and lunar module. To distinguish between them, NASA often referred to the lunar module's version as the Lunar Guidance Computer (LGC).) through the fault-tolerant design in both its hardware and software, helped achieve a successful Moon landing despite encountering significant problems during the final descent. Hamilton had led the development of most the guidance computer's software, building on asynchronous executive software designed by J. Halcombe Laning.

The first indication of a problem came a little over 5 minutes into the lunar module's powered descent from 50,000 feet above the Moon's surface, a process that involved the guidance computer firing the rocket engine to slow the spacecraft. At an altitude of around 30,000–35,000 feet, the computer triggered the first of five "program alarms", which indicated "executive overflows", meaning that the computer was unable to process all tasks in the time available and had to drop some of them. The problem was considered serious enough for NASA to consider aborting the mission. During the next 4.5 minutes these alarms (labeled "1201" and "1202", respectively) kept resurfacing. But each time an overload threatened, the computer reduced its load — by doing a software restart, in which the computer ran only its highest-priority tasks, an early implementation of preemptive multitasking. (Note: The software's "restart protection" preserved a job's most recent data, so it could recover seamlessly if forced to restart.) This lowered the load enough to resume normal operation, but it remained higher than usual, for reasons unclear at the time. And 40 seconds after the first program alarm, another one occurred, followed by another about 30 seconds after that one. However, Steve Bales and Jack Garman, NASA computer engineers in mission control, recognized the program alarms were only warnings and advised Apollo 11 to proceed. About 12.6 minutes (Note: From the start of powered descent (mission time: 102:33:05.01) to the lunar landing (102:45:39.90), about 12 minutes and 35 seconds elapsed.) after the start of its powered descent, the lunar module had landed safely on the Moon.

According to Lunar Module Pilot Buzz Aldrin, he had left the rendezvous radar on intentionally during the descent along with the landing radar. While this was not part of the official procedure, it was sound, since in case of an abort, he and Neill Armstrong could lock onto the signal of their mothership Columbia immediately. In their training, the crew of the subsequent mission Apollo 12 had done the same and encountered the errors "1201" and "1202" as well. They were told that these alarms were no reason to abort the mission, but this information had never been passed on to the crew of Apollo 11, so they were in the dark about its consequences.

The computer should have been able to cope with the data of both radars simultaneously, but as it turned out, additional interrupts caused by incorrectly phased power supplied to the lander's rendezvous radar finally had overwhelmed it.

Paul Curto, a senior technologist who nominated Hamilton for a NASA Space Act Award, called Hamilton's work "the foundation for ultra-reliable software design".

=== Businesses ===
Hamilton co-founded with Saydean Zeldin a company called Higher Order Software (HOS) to further develop ideas about error prevention and fault tolerance emerging from their experience at MIT working on the Apollo program. They created a product called USE.IT, based on the HOS methodology they developed at MIT. It was successfully used in numerous government programs including a project to formalize and implement C-IDEF, an automated version of IDEF, a modeling language developed by the U.S. Air Force in the Integrated Computer-Aided Manufacturing (ICAM) project. In 1980, British-Israeli computer scientist David Harel published a proposal for a structured programming language derived from HOS from the viewpoint of and/or subgoals. Others have used HOS to formalize the semantics of linguistic quantifiers, and to formalize the design of reliable real-time embedded systems.

Hamilton was the CEO of HOS and left the company later on. In March 1986, she founded Hamilton Technologies, Inc. in Cambridge, Massachusetts. The company was developed around the Universal Systems Language (USL) and its associated automated environment, the 001 Tool Suite, based on her paradigm of development before the fact for systems design and software development.

== Legacy ==
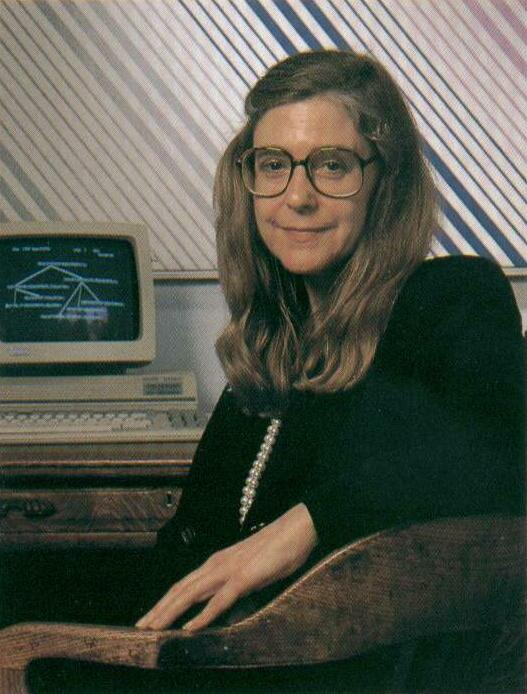
Official photo for NASA, 1989

Hamilton has been credited with naming the discipline of "software engineering". Hamilton detailed how she came to make up the term "software engineering":

When I first came up with the term, no one had heard of it before, at least in our world. It was an ongoing joke for a long time. They liked to kid me about my radical ideas. It was a memorable day when one of the most respected hardware gurus explained to everyone in a meeting that he agreed with me that the process of building software should also be considered an engineering discipline, just like with hardware. Not because of his acceptance of the new 'term' per se, but because we had earned his and the acceptance of the others in the room as being in an engineering field in its own right.

When Hamilton started using the term "software engineering" during the early Apollo missions, software development was not taken seriously compared to other engineering disciplines, something she aimed to change. Over time the term "software engineering" gained the same respect as any other technical discipline. The IEEE Software September/October 2018 issue celebrates the 50th anniversary of software engineering. Hamilton talked about "Errors" and how they influenced her work related to software engineering and how her language, USL, could be used to prevent the majority of "Errors" in a system. With USL, rather than continuing to test for errors, her program was designed to keep most errors out of the system from the beginning. USL was created after her knowledge and experience from the Apollo mission, in which she determined a mathematical theory for systems and software. This method was then, and still is, highly impactful to the field of software engineering. Writing in Wired, Robert McMillan noted: "At MIT she assisted in the creation of the core principles in computer programming as she worked with her colleagues in writing code for the world's first portable computer". Hamilton's innovations go beyond playing an important role in getting humans to the Moon. According to Wired's Karen Tegan Padir: "She, along with that other early programming pioneer, COBOL inventor [sic] Grace Hopper, also deserve tremendous credit for helping to open the door for more women to enter and succeed in STEM fields like software."

=== Tributes ===
In 2017, a "Women of NASA" Lego set went on sale featuring minifigures of Hamilton, astronauts Mae Jemison and Sally Ride, and NASA's first Chief of Astronomy, Nancy Grace Roman. The set was initially proposed by Maia Weinstock as a tribute to the women's contributions to NASA history, and Hamilton's section of the set features a recreation of her famous 1969 photo posing with a stack of her software listings.

In 2019, to celebrate the 50-year anniversary of the Apollo 11 mission, Google made a tribute to Hamilton. The mirrors at the Ivanpah Solar Power Facility were configured to create a picture of Hamilton alongside Apollo 11 designs that appeared under moonlight.

Margo Madison, a fictional NASA engineer in the alternate history series For All Mankind, was inspired by Hamilton.

== Personal life and death ==
Hamilton had a sister, Kathryn Heafield. She met her first husband, James Cox Hamilton, in the mid-1950s while attending college. They married on June 15, 1958, the summer after she graduated from Earlham. She briefly taught high school mathematics and French at a public school in Boston, Indiana. The couple then moved to Boston, Massachusetts, where they had a daughter, Lauren, born on November 10, 1959. They divorced in 1967 and Margaret married Dan Lickly two years later. Margaret and Dan Lickly divorced in the early 1970s.

Hamilton died on September 30, 2026 at the age of 90, at a hospital in Cambridge, Massachusetts, due to multiple organ failure.

== Awards ==
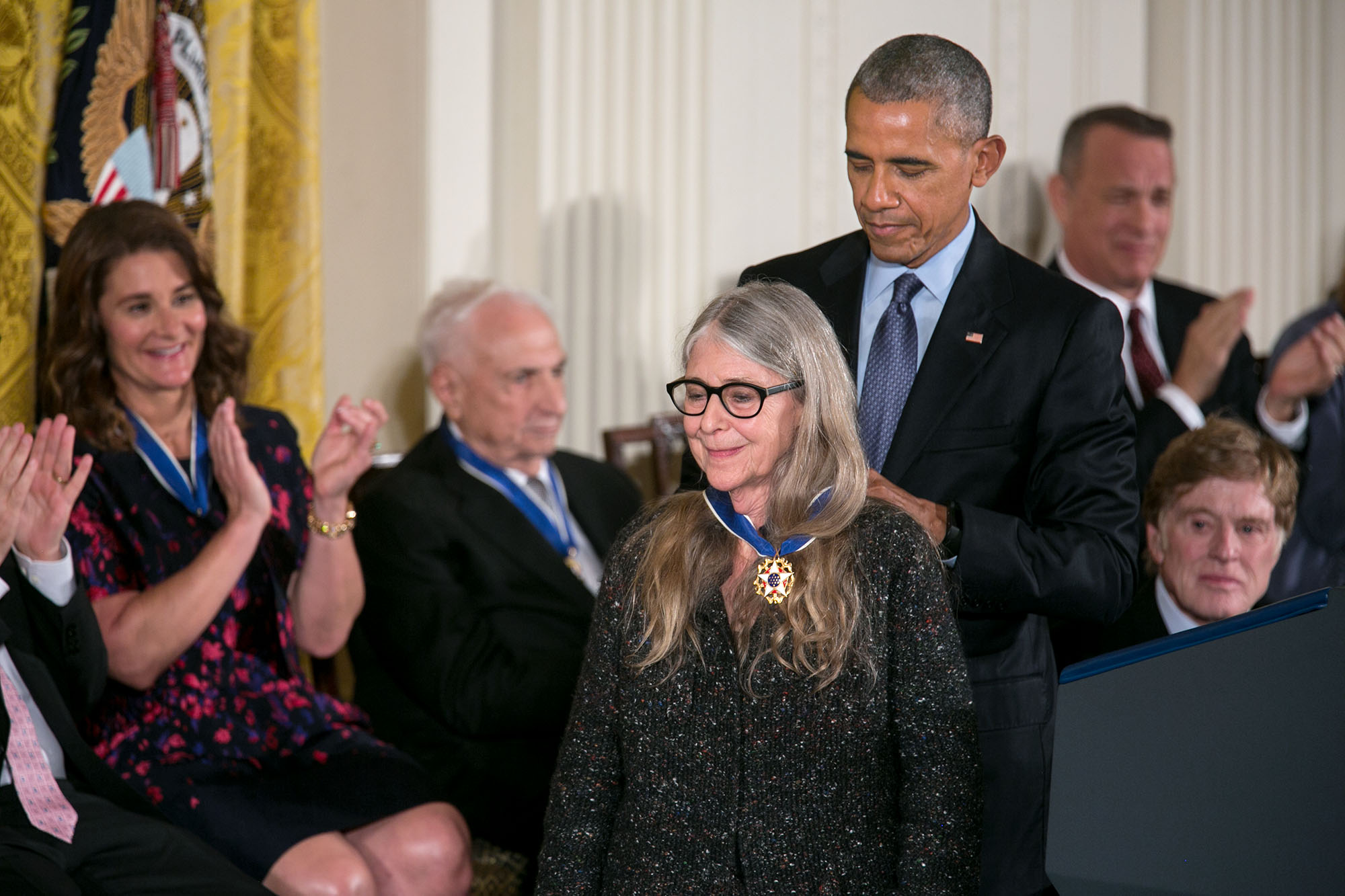
Barack Obama awards the Presidential Medal of Freedom to Hamilton in 2016.

- In 1986, Hamilton received the Augusta Ada Lovelace Award by the Association for Women in Computing.
- In 2003, she was given the NASA Exceptional Space Act Award for scientific and technical contributions. The award included $37,200, the largest amount awarded to any individual in NASA's history.
- In 2009, she received the Outstanding Alumni Award from Earlham College.
- In 2016, she received the Presidential Medal of Freedom from Barack Obama, the highest civilian honor in the United States.
- On April 28, 2017, she received the Computer History Museum Fellow Award, which honors exceptional men and women whose computing ideas have changed the world.
- In 2018, she was awarded an honorary doctorate degree by the Polytechnic University of Catalonia.
- In 2019, she was awarded The Washington Award.
- In 2019, she was awarded an honorary doctorate degree by Bard College.
- In 2019, she was awarded the Intrepid Lifetime Achievement Award.
- In 2022, she was inducted into the National Aviation Hall of Fame in Dayton, Ohio.

== Publications ==
- Hamilton, M.; Zeldin, S. (March 1976). "Higher Order Software—A Methodology for Defining Software". IEEE Transactions on Software Engineering. SE-2 (1): 9–32. doi:10.1109/TSE.1976.233798. S2CID 7799553.
- Hamilton, M.; Zeldin, S. (January 1, 1979). "The relationship between design and verification". Journal of Systems and Software. 1: 29–56. doi:10.1016/0164-1212(79)90004-9.
- Hamilton, M. (April 1994). "Inside Development Before the Fact". (Cover story). Special Editorial Supplement. 8ES-24ES. Electronic Design.
- Hamilton, M. (June 1994). "001: A Full Life Cycle Systems Engineering and Software Development Environment". (Cover story). Special Editorial Supplement. 22ES-30ES. Electronic Design.
- Hamilton, M.; Hackler, W. R. (2004). "Deeply Integrated Guidance Navigation Unit (DI-GNU) Common Software Architecture Principles". (Revised December 29, 2004). DAAAE30-02-D-1020 and DAAB07-98-D-H502/0180, Picatinny Arsenal, NJ, 2003–2004.
- Hamilton, M.; Hackler, W. R. (2007). "Universal Systems Language for Preventative Systems Engineering", Proc. 5th Ann. Conf. Systems Eng. Res. (CSER), Stevens Institute of Technology, Mar. 2007, paper #36.
- Hamilton, Margaret H.; Hackler, William R. (2007). "8.3.2 a Formal Universal Systems Semantics for SysML". Incose International Symposium. 17 (1). Wiley: 1333–1357. doi:10.1002/j.2334-5837.2007.tb02952.x. ISSN 2334-5837. S2CID 57214708.
- Hamilton, Margaret H.; Hackler, William R. (2008). "Universal Systems Language: Lessons Learned from Apollo". Computer. 41 (12). Institute of Electrical and Electronics Engineers (IEEE): 34–43. Bibcode:2008Compr..41l..34H. doi:10.1109/mc.2008.541. ISSN 0018-9162.
- Hamilton, M. H. (September 2018). "What the Errors Tell Us". IEEE Software. 35 (5): 32–37. Bibcode:2018ISoft..35e..32H. doi:10.1109/MS.2018.290110447. S2CID 52896962.

== See also ==
- List of pioneers in computer science
