= PDRS =

PDRS may refer to:

- Payload Deployment and Retrieval System
- Probe Data Relay Subsystem
