= LOCAD =

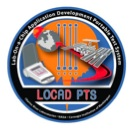
LOCAD-PTS Team Identifier

The Lab-on-a-Chip Applications Development (LOCAD) element is a set of related lab-on-a-chip projects at NASA. The projects develop integrated lab-on-a-chip products in three areas related to space exploration: Environmental Control and Life Systems Support (ECLSS), Medical Systems, and Remote Exploration. NASA conducts activities related to these projects both at NASA Marshall Space Flight Center and aboard the International Space Station (ISS).

== Portable Test System ==
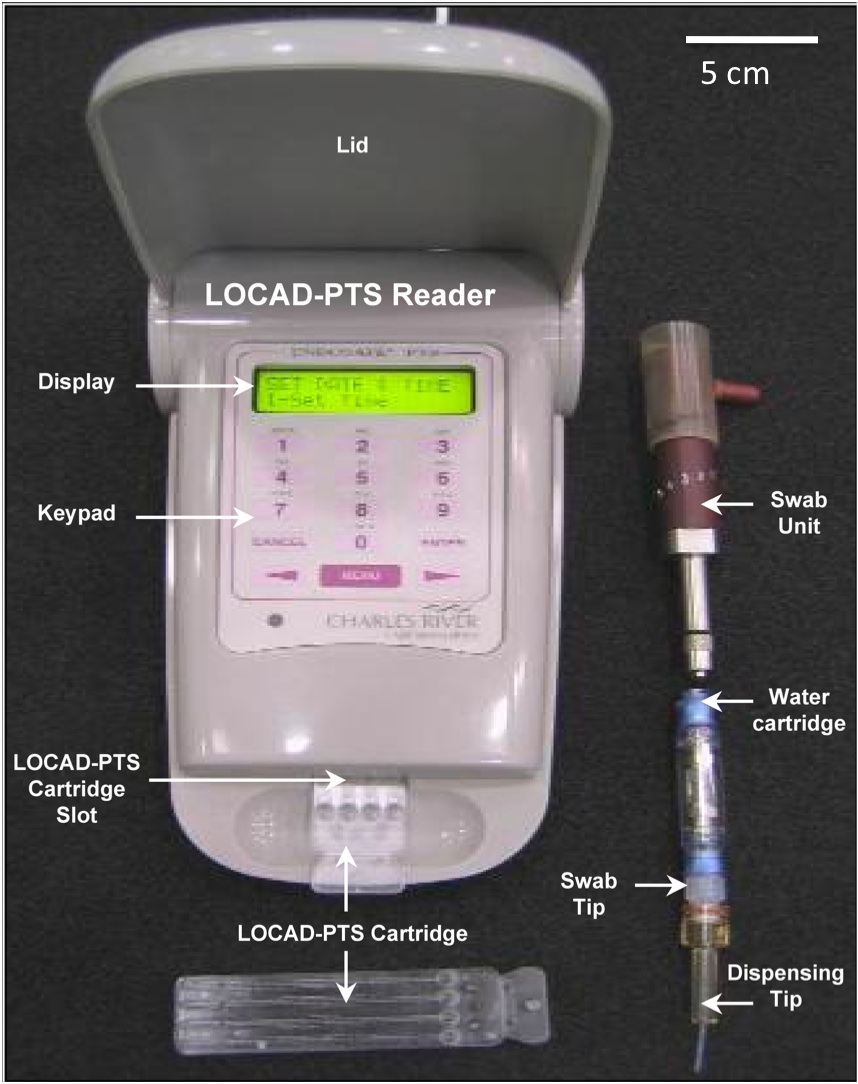
The LOCAD-PTS, currently aboard the ISS.

The Lab-On-a-Chip Application Development – Portable Test System (LOCAD-PTS) is a handheld device for microbial monitoring aboard the ISS. It evolved from the Endosafe-Portable Test System (Endosafe-PTS), developed by Charles River Laboratories for use in the pharmaceutical and health care industries. In 2004–2005, Charles River Laboratories teamed up with Carnegie Institution for Science and NASA Marshall Space Flight Center, including BAE Systems and Jacobs Technology, to modify the Endosafe-PTS device (and a sample handling system) for spaceflight. The LOCAD-PTS project has been funded in large part by NASA's Exploration Systems Mission Directorate (ESMD), under the Exploration Technology Development Program (ETDP), and specifically under the umbrella of Advanced Environmental Monitoring and Control (AEMC).

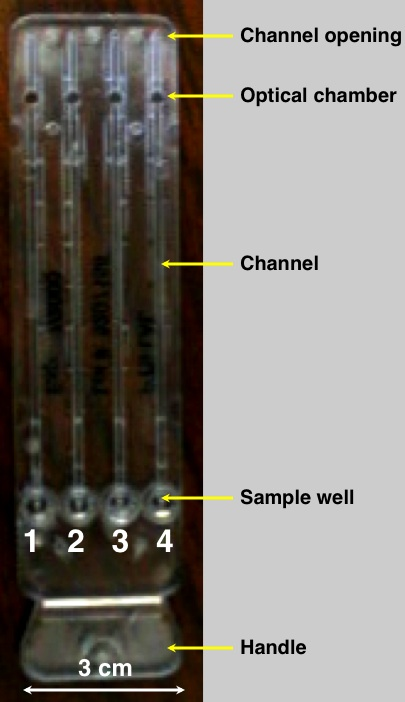
A LOCAD-PTS Cartridge.

The device itself (or reader) weighs 2.2 pounds and is a combined spectrophotometer, heater and pump, operated with multiple interchangeable cartridges for the detection of different microbial molecules. There are three different LOCAD-PTS cartridges aboard the ISS, for the detection of three different microbial molecules: endotoxin, glucan and lipoteichoic acid. These three molecules are found mainly within gram-negative bacteria, fungi and gram-positive bacteria, respectively. Endotoxin and glucan are detected with the Limulus amebocyte lysate (LAL) enzyme cascade, derived from the horseshoe crab Limulus polyphemus. Lipoteichoic acid is detected with the Pro-Phenol Oxidase (PPO) enzyme cascade derived from the Jonah crab, Cancer borealis. By the amplification of a small signal, these enzyme cascades allow detection of very low amounts of starting microbial material. An astronaut can take a swab sample from a cabin surface, dissolve it in endotoxin-free water, and analyze it quantitatively with LOCAD-PTS in microgravity, all in under 15 minutes. Traditional culture-based methods aboard the ISS take several days and often require return of samples to Earth for more in-depth analysis by scientists on the ground.

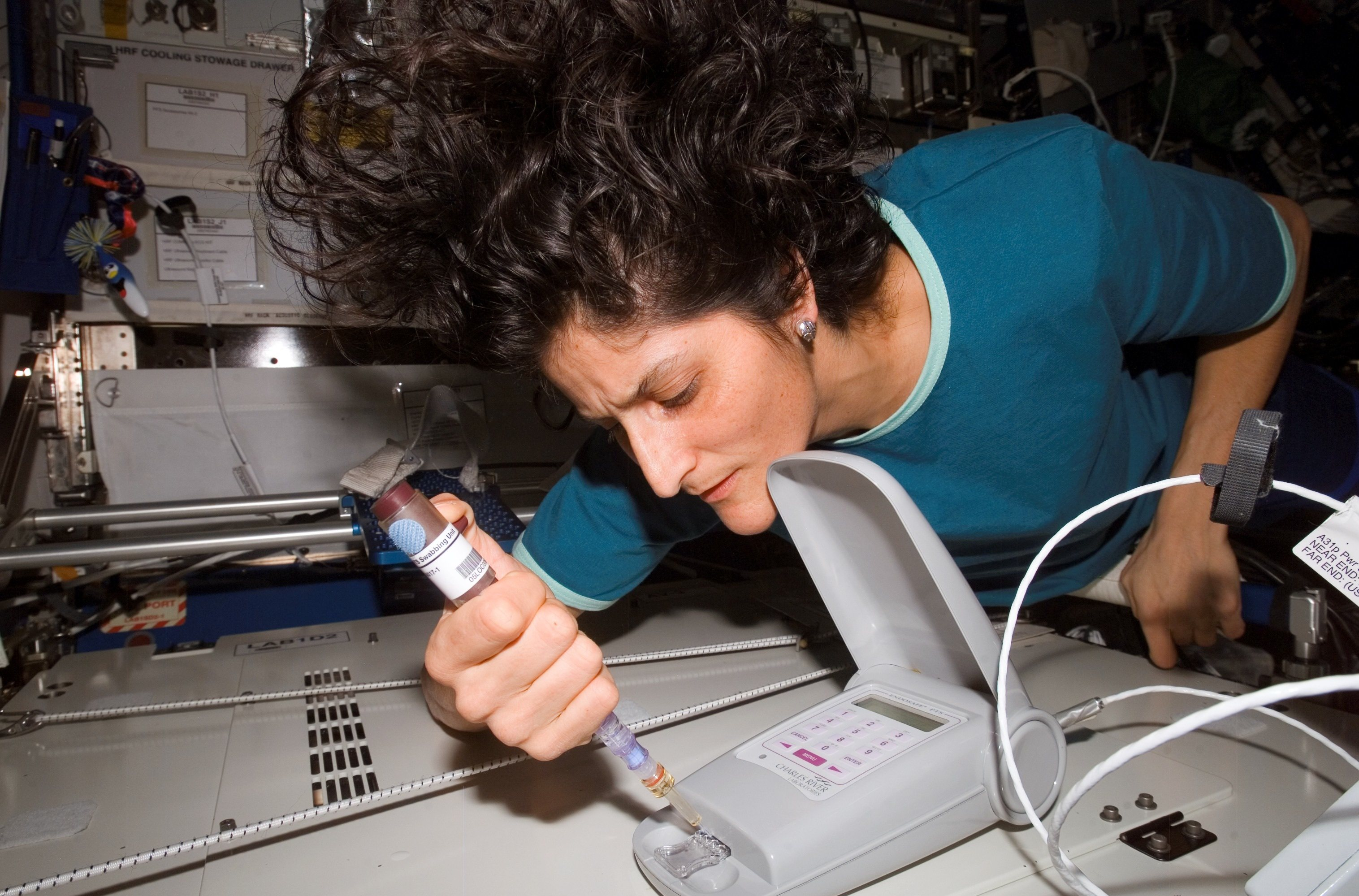
Suni Williams analyzes a surface sample with LOCAD-PTS aboard the ISS (March 31, 2007)

LOCAD-PTS was launched to the ISS on December 9, 2006, aboard Space Shuttle Discovery STS-116. Following a four-month period of storage aboard the ISS, the device was first used by Expedition 14/15 Flight Engineer Suni Williams on March 31, 2007, to analyze surfaces within Unity. Since that time, LOCAD-PTS has been used extensively by the crews of Expedition 16–Expedition 18 to monitor microbial material throughout the ISS. The LOCAD Team has supported each operation of LOCAD-PTS aboard the ISS from consoles at the NASA Payload Operations and Integration Center (POIC) at NASA Marshall Space Flight Center. LOCAD-PTS will continue to be used aboard ISS through October 2009 by Expedition 20 astronauts Mike Barratt and Tim Kopra.

The first phase of ISS operations took place between March 2007 to February 2008 (Expeditions 14–16), when LAL cartridges were used to detect endotoxin on surfaces within the ISS. Endotoxin was found to be distributed throughout the ISS, despite previous indications that most bacteria on ISS surfaces were gram-positive. Endotoxin was detected at 50% of all surface sites and commonly found on surfaces within exercise, hygiene, sleeping and dining areas. Endotoxin was found at every surface site where Colony Forming Units (CFUs) were observed with culture-based contact slide methods. LAL-Glucan cartridges, for the detection of Beta-1,3-glucan, were launched to the ISS aboard Space Shuttle STS-123 in March 2008. Preliminary results with these cartridges showed similar patterns to those observed for endotoxin, but glucan was found at higher levels and found to be far more widespread throughout the ISS. The Gram+ cartridges, for the detection of lipoteichoic acid) were launched to the ISS aboard STS-126 on November 14, 2008. Tests with these cartridges have been performed during Expeditions 18 – 20.

=== Field tests and scientific expeditions ===
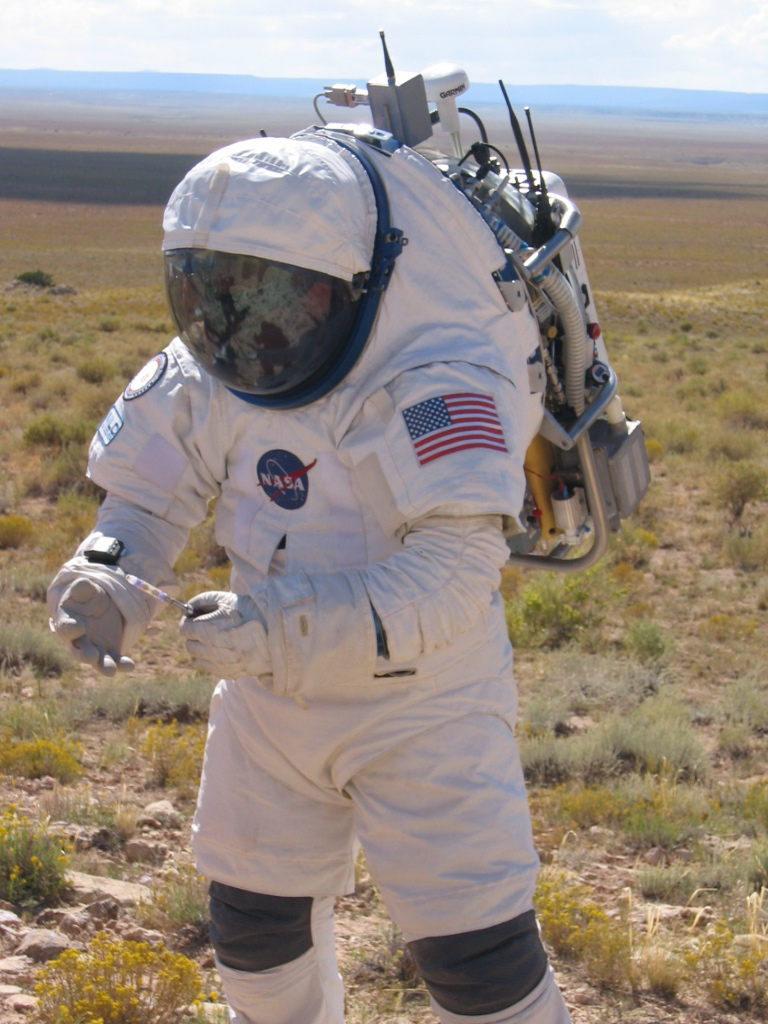
Test of LOCAD-PTS swab system during simulated surface Extravehicular Activity (EVA) at Meteor Crater, NASA Desert RATS (September 2005).

Before LOCAD-PTS was launched to space, it was tested extensively in simulated microgravity with the use of parabolic flight, to verify nominal function of the instrument and sample handling procedures. It was also used for several years on scientific expeditions to study microbial life in extreme environments on Earth. These extreme environments included Svalbard in the high Arctic (80N latitude) during the NASA-sponsored Arctic Mars Analog Svalbard Expedition (AMASE), volcanoes in Kamchatka, far east Russia, during Russian-NASA Astrobiology Institute (NAI) Expeditions in 2004 and 2006, the desert of Arizona during the NASA Desert Research and Technology Studies (Desert RATS) of 2005 and 2006, and the underwater habitat Aquarius in the Florida Keys during NASA Extreme Environment Mission Operations (NEEMO) Expedition 5, under command of astronaut Peggy Whitson, and Mount Everest.

LOCAD-PTS is a technology supported within NASA's Advanced Environmental Monitoring and Control (AEMC) Program, which is in turn, supported by the Exploration Technology Development Program (ETDP) of NASA's Exploration Systems Mission Directorate (ESMD). All technologies within AEMC have been reviewed by the National Research Council and LOCAD-PTS currently has over two years experience operating on orbit.

== LOCAD-PTS Exploration ==
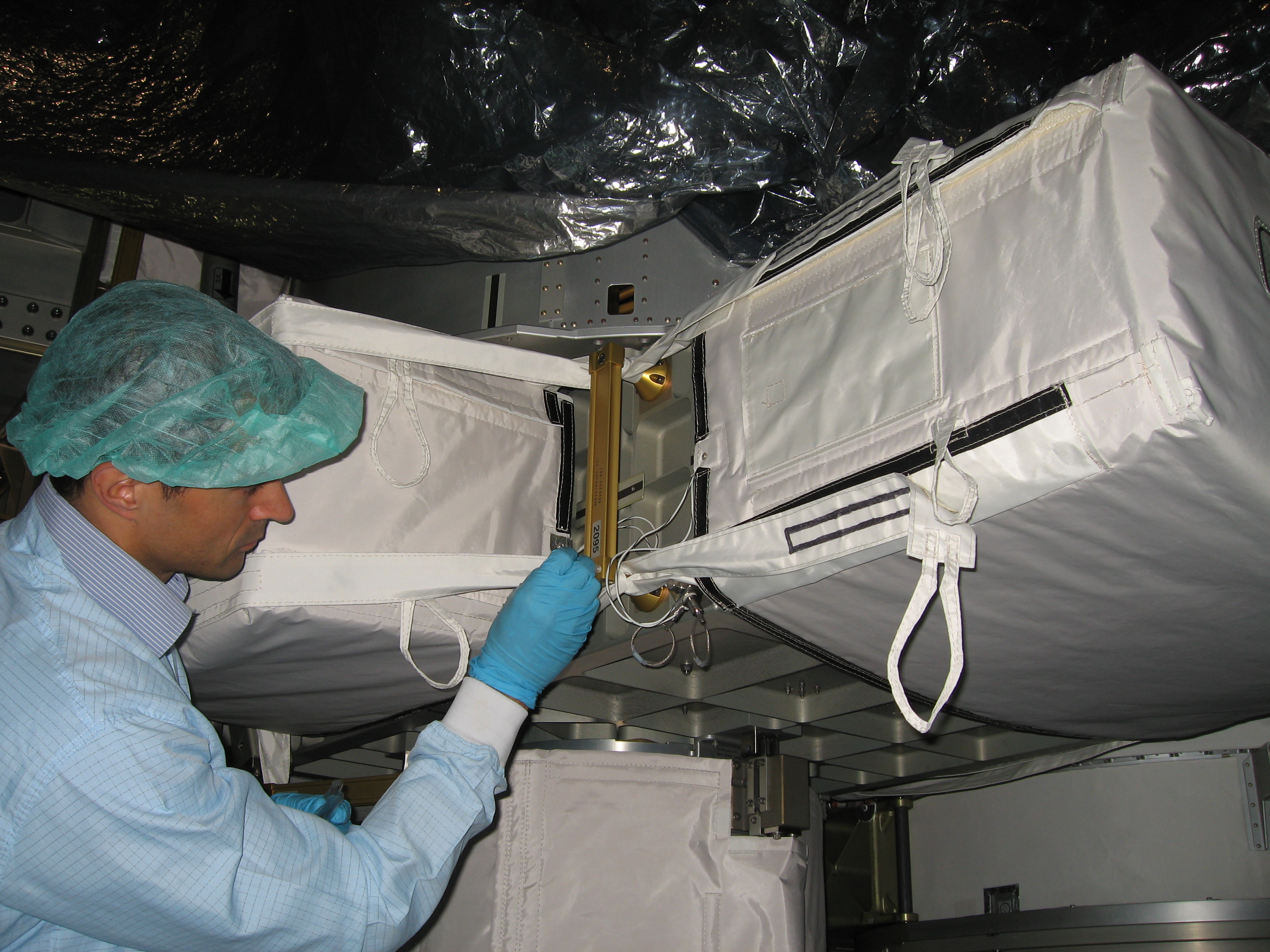
Jake Maule swabs a handrail on the S6 Truss before launch (December 9, 2008).

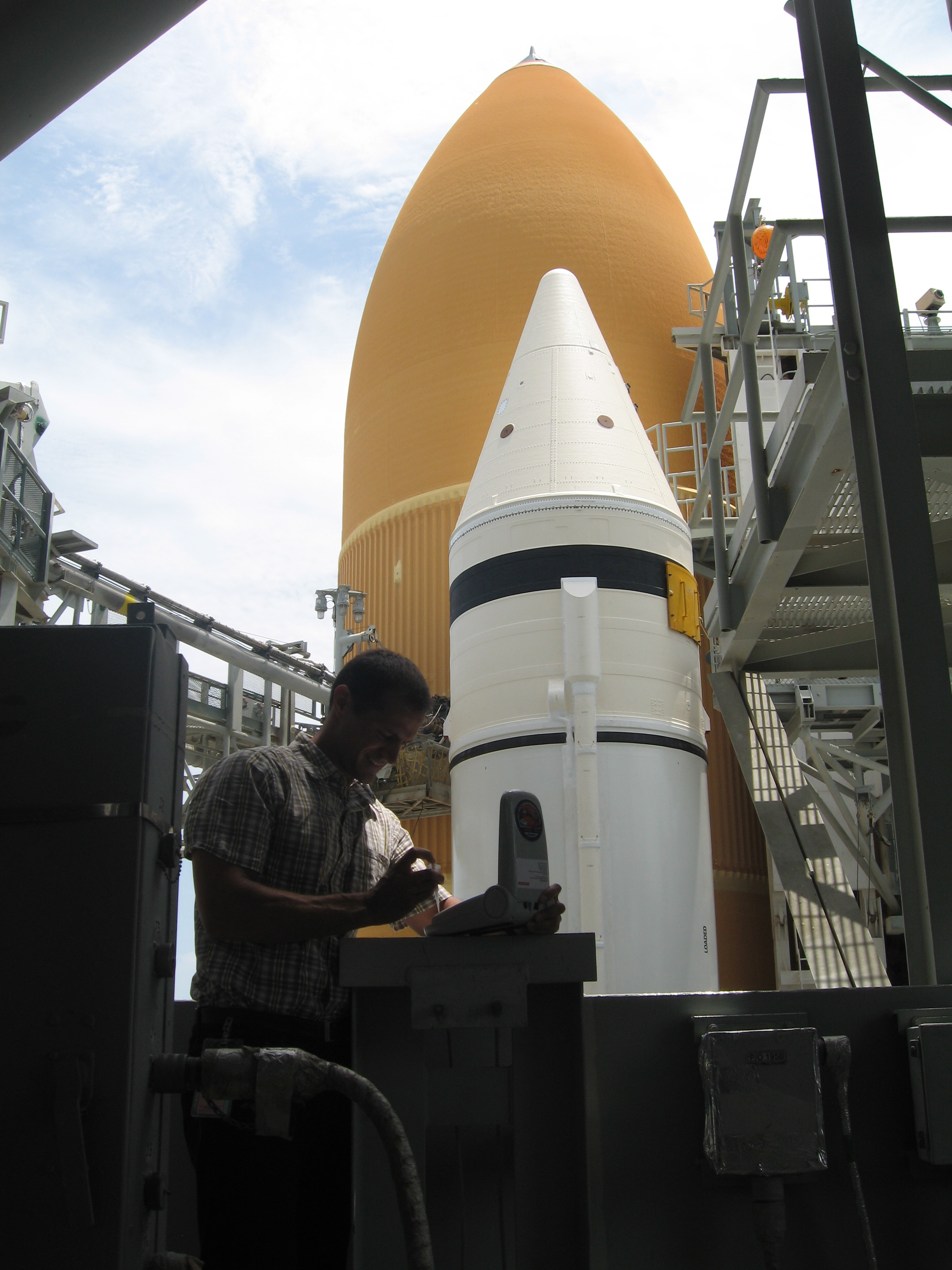
Jake Maule uses LOCAD-PTS to perform microbial survey of Pad 39A (August 7, 2009).

LOCAD-PTS Exploration is an ISS experiment funded by the Moon and Mars Analogue Mission Activities (MMAMA) Program of NASA's Science Mission Directorate. It is a collaboration between BAE Systems, Charles River Laboratories (CRL), NASA Johnson Space Center (Astronaut Office, Crew and Thermal Systems Division, and Extravehicular Activity (EVA) and Crew Survival Systems Branch), NASA Kennedy Space Center and NASA Marshall Space Flight Center. The goal of the experiment is to design and test procedures to monitor and document the spread of biological material associated with human spaceflight, both before and after launch, in preparation for the human exploration of the Moon and Mars. The LOCAD-PTS Exploration experiment has been funded by NASA's Science Mission Directorate (SMD), under the Moon and Mars Analogue Mission Activities (MMAMA) Program, and is the first SMD-funded experiment aboard the ISS.

The ISS Starboard S6 Truss-section was analyzed with LOCAD-PTS in October 2008 and December 2008—while located in the Space Station Processing Facility (SSPF) at NASA's Kennedy Space Center—and again in space following launch of Space Shuttle Discovery STS-119.

The S6 Truss was swabbed in space on flight day 5, March 19, 2009, during the first spacewalk by Steve Swanson (EV1) and Richard R. Arnold (EV2). This 'swab' was performed indirectly with the spacesuit gloves. The gloves themselves were swabbed inside the ISS both before and after EVA, with LOCAD-PTS, by Expedition 18 Flight Engineer Sandy Magnus. Swab samples were then analyzed aboard the ISS by Magnus on flight day 7, March 21, 2009. This experiment marked the first time in human spaceflight that EVA crew checked themselves for microbes before EVA, and was mentioned by the STS-119 crew to President Obama during a video conference from space during STS-119. This type of procedure will be required to monitor and document the spread of biological material in support of NASA's goal to search for life on other planets and to comply with planetary protection regulations.

Further LOCAD-PTS Exploration tests were performed on the Flight 17A Multi-Purpose Logistics Module (MPLM) "Leonardo" in the Payload Changeout Room on Pad 39A during August 5–8, 2009. The 17A MPLM was also tested after insertion into the payload bay of Space Shuttle Discovery STS-128, scheduled for launch on August 25, 2009. In addition to the MPLM itself, a microbial survey of the entire Rotating Service Structure (RSS) and Mobile Launch Platform (MLP) was also performed. The external surfaces of the 17A MPLM will also be tested after landing of STS-128. Each MPLM is a cargo carrier and brought back to Earth in the Space Shuttle Payload Bay.

=== Gallery ===
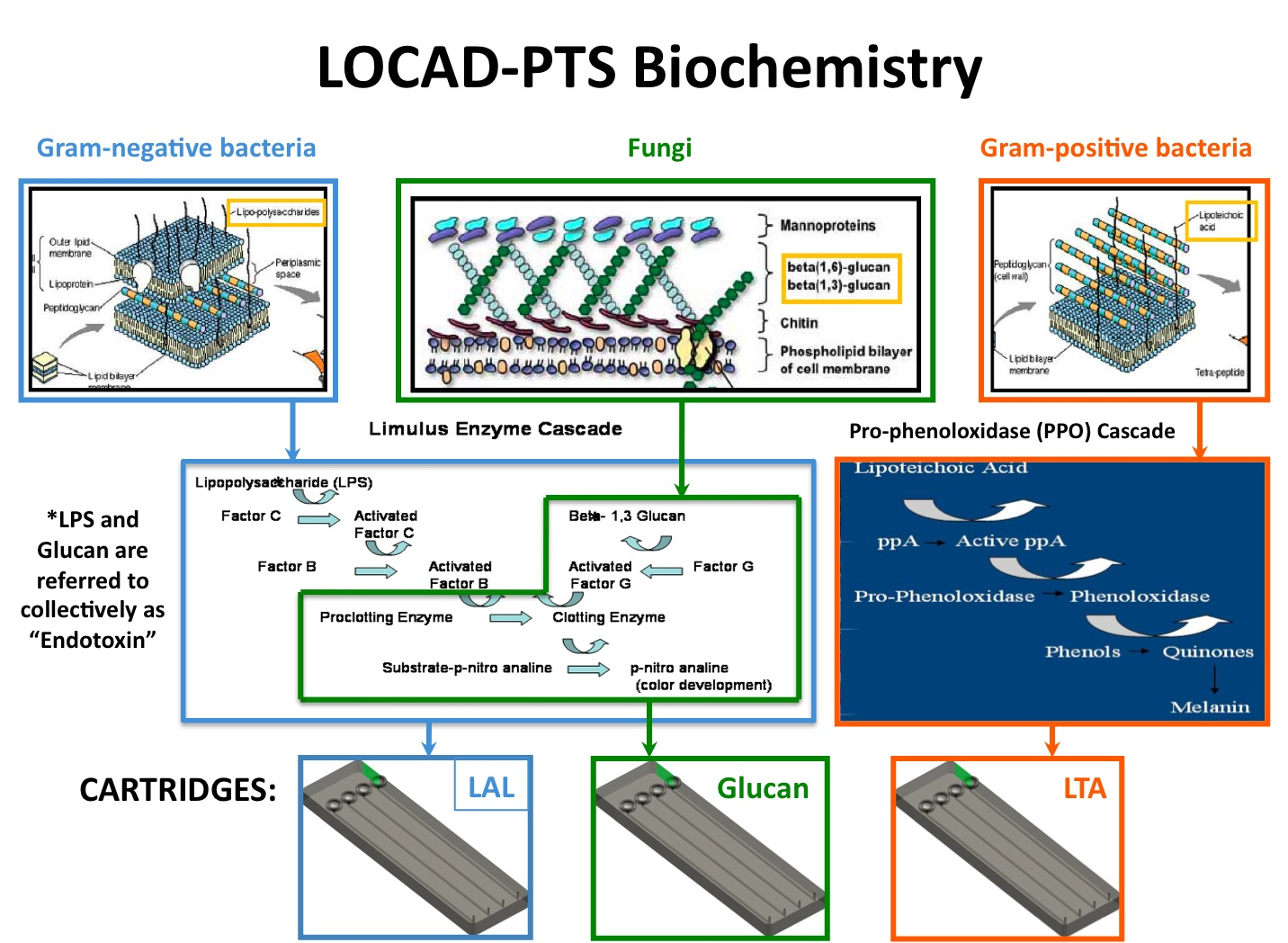
Enzyme Cascades for all three types of LOCAD-PTS Cartridge.

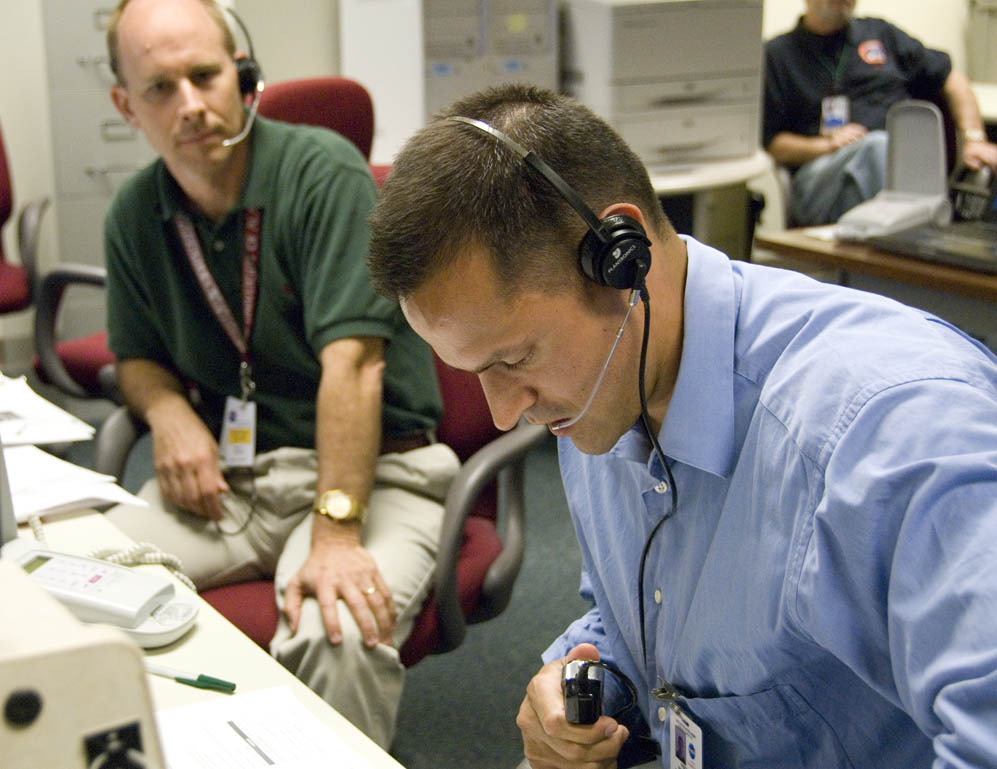
LOCAD-PTS Team talks to ISS from NASA mission control (March 31, 2007).

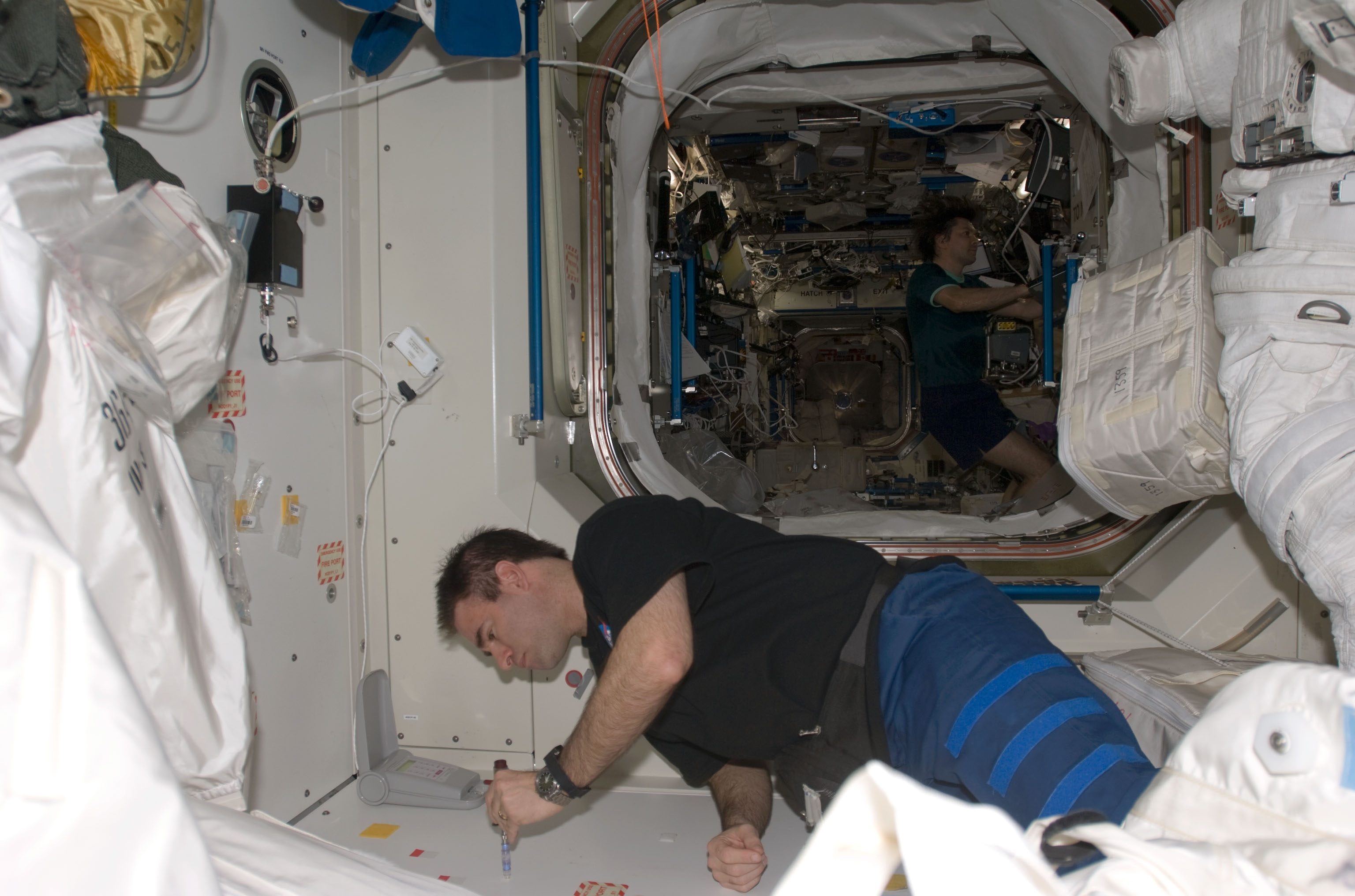
Greg Chamitoff uses LOCAD-PTS during Expedition 17 (June, 2008).

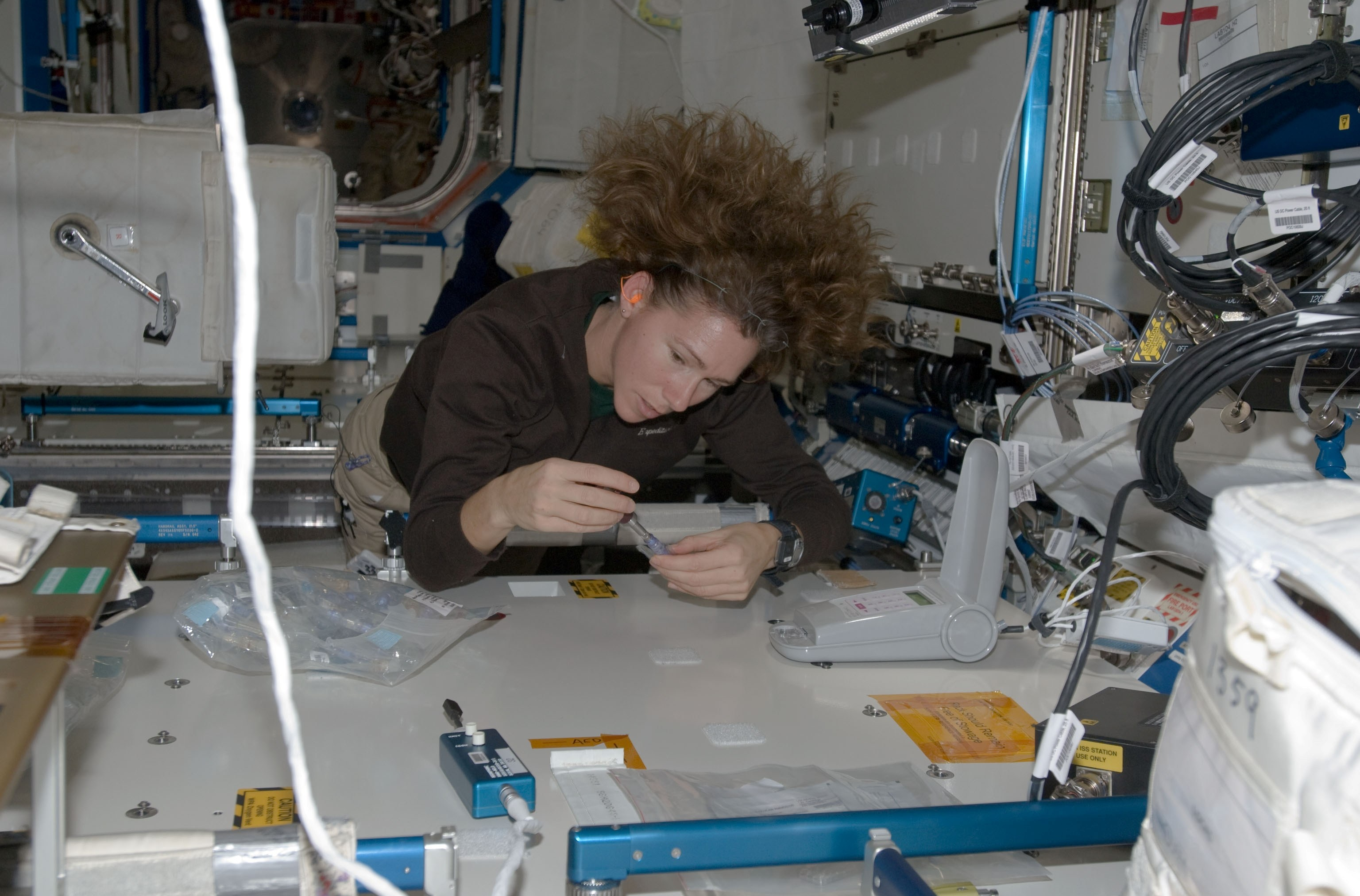
Sandy Magnus uses LOCAD-PTS during Expedition 18 (Jan., 2009).

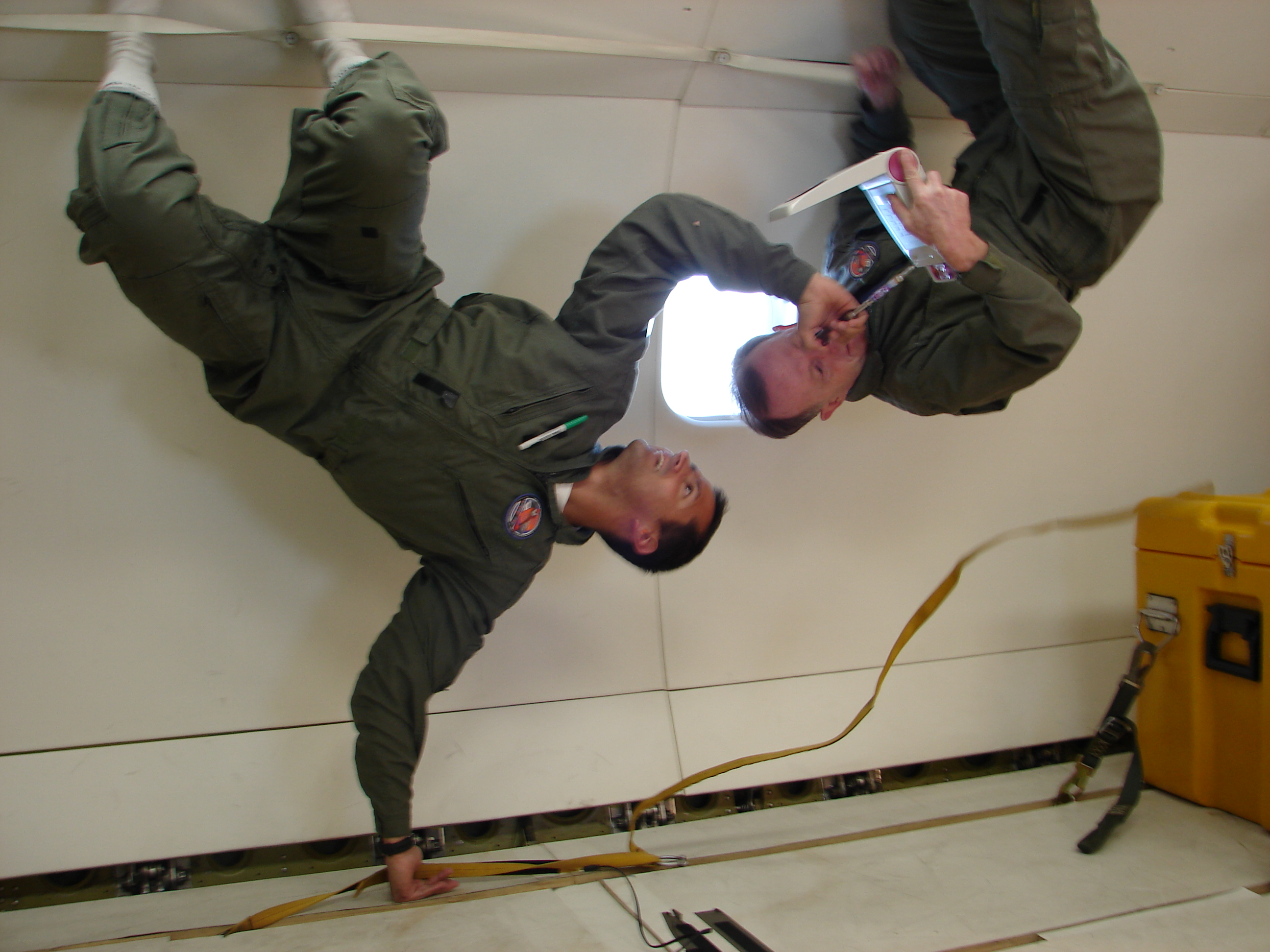
Norm Wainwright (right) and Jake Maule test LOCAD-PTS during parabolic flight (2007).

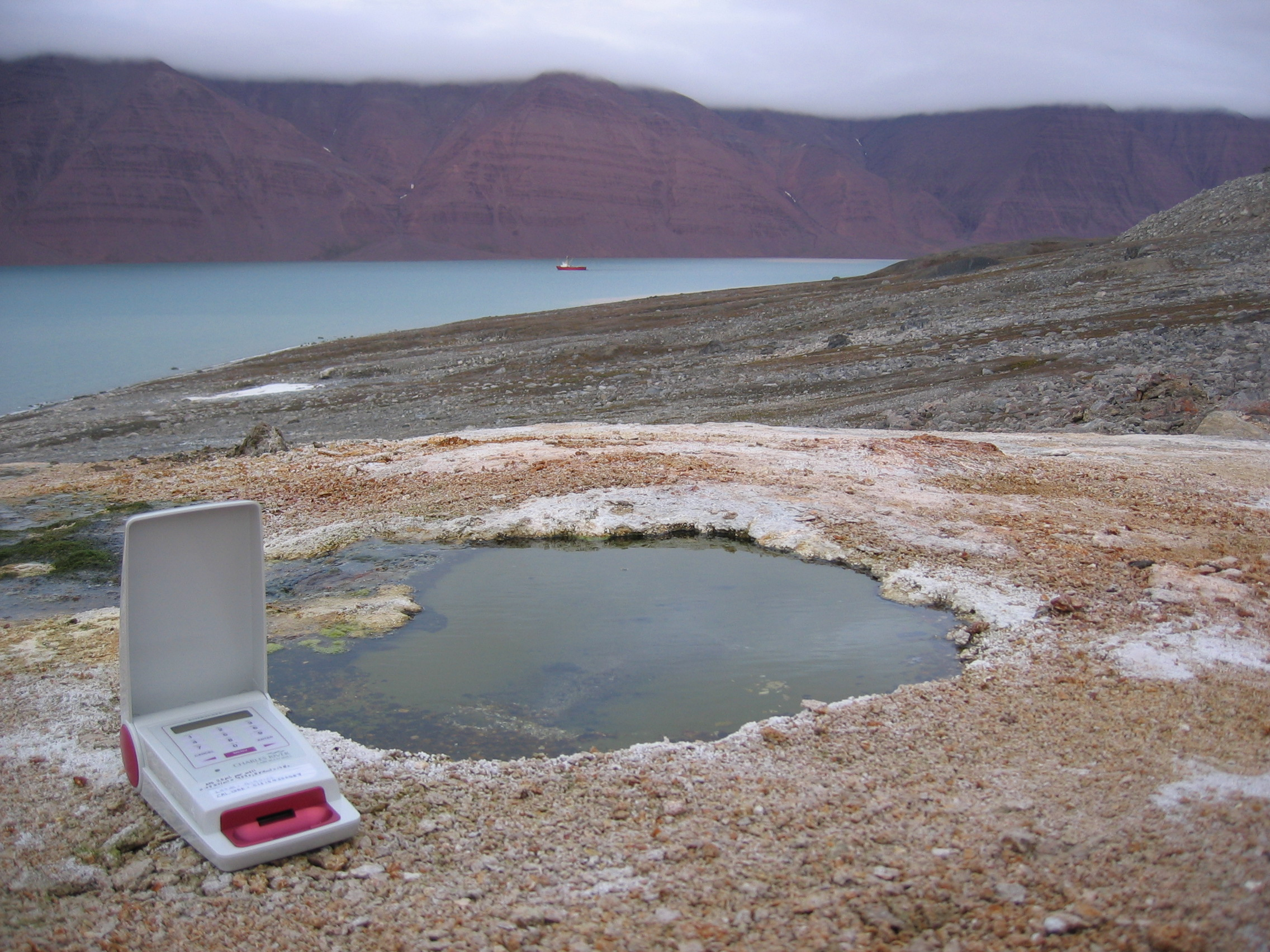
LOCAD-PTS analyzes microbial life in Arctic hot springs during AMASE (2004).

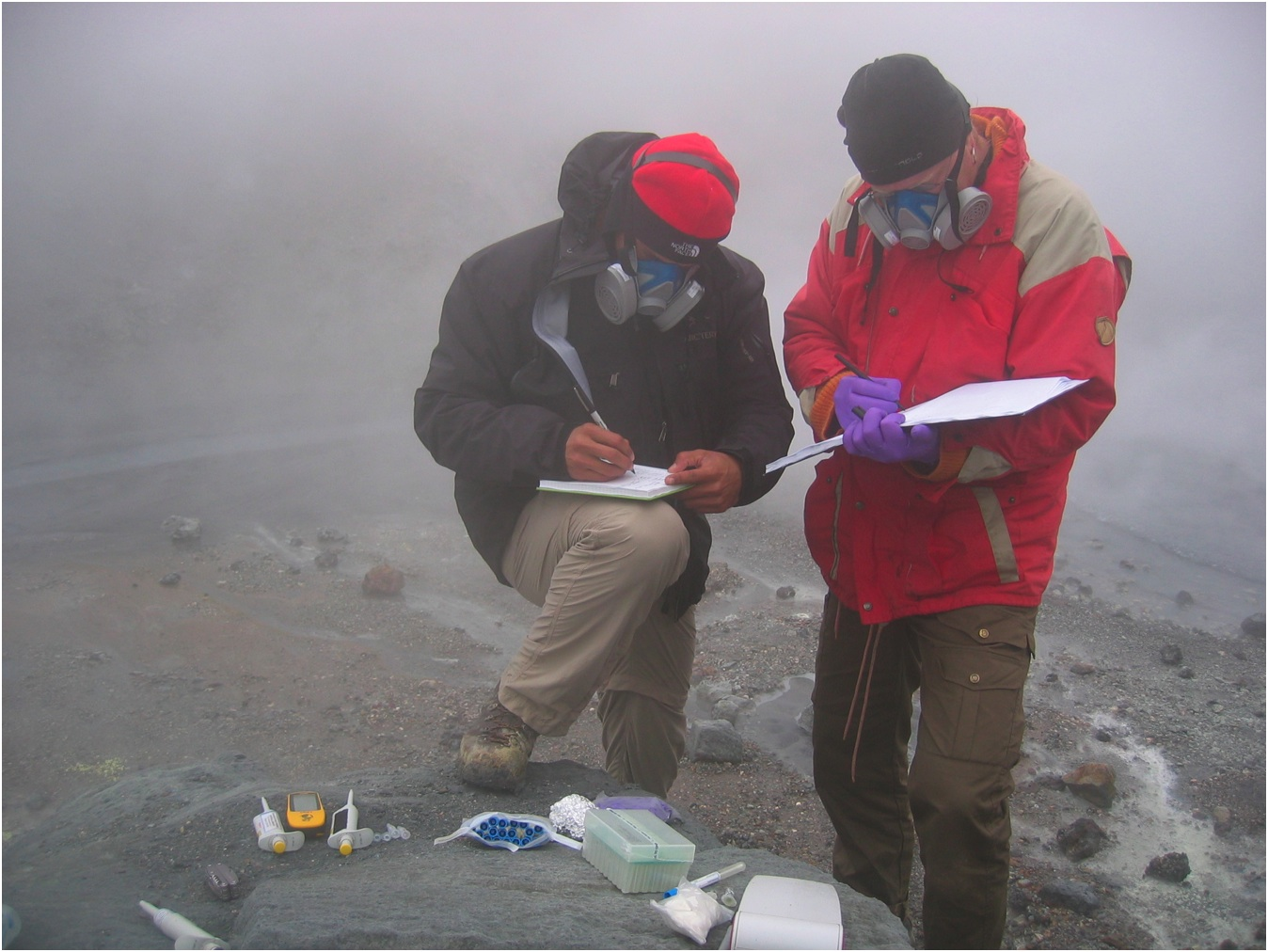
Jake Maule (left) and Jan Toporski (right) in crater of Mutnovsky Volcano, Kamchatka (2004).

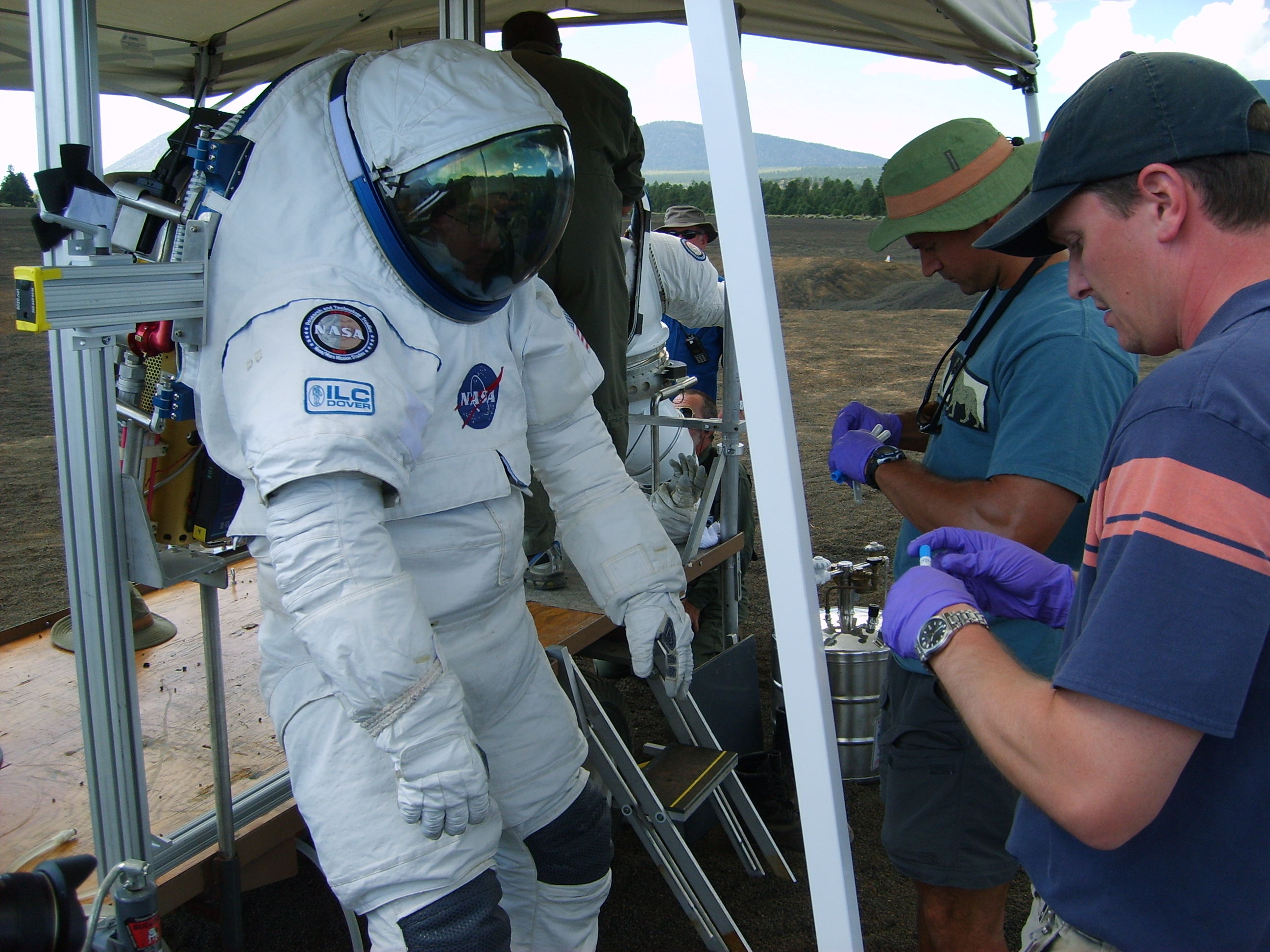
Mike Damon (foreground) and Jake Maule at NASA Desert-RATS, Arizona (September, 2006).

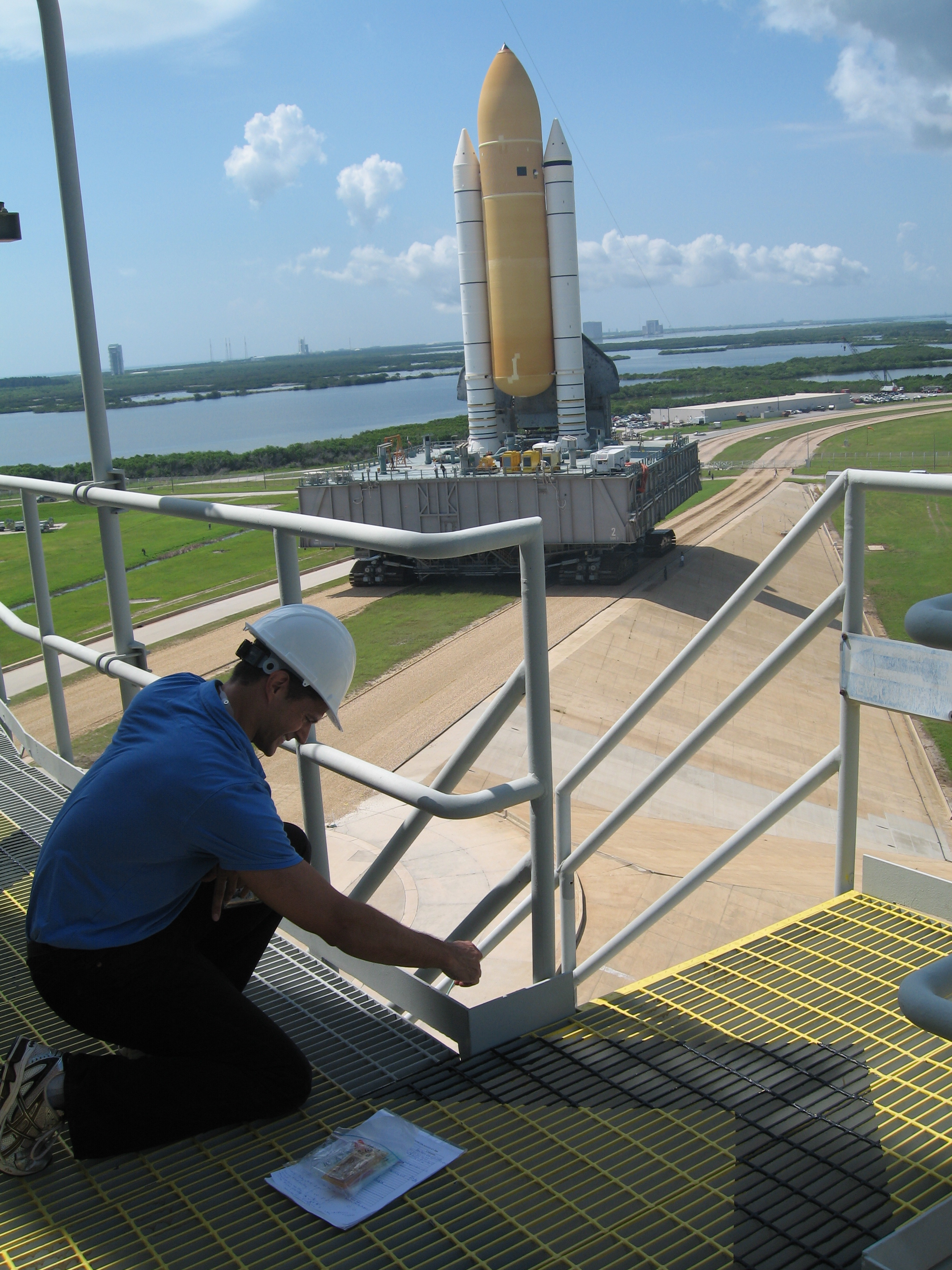
Jake Maule performs microbial survey of Pad 39A (August 4, 2009).

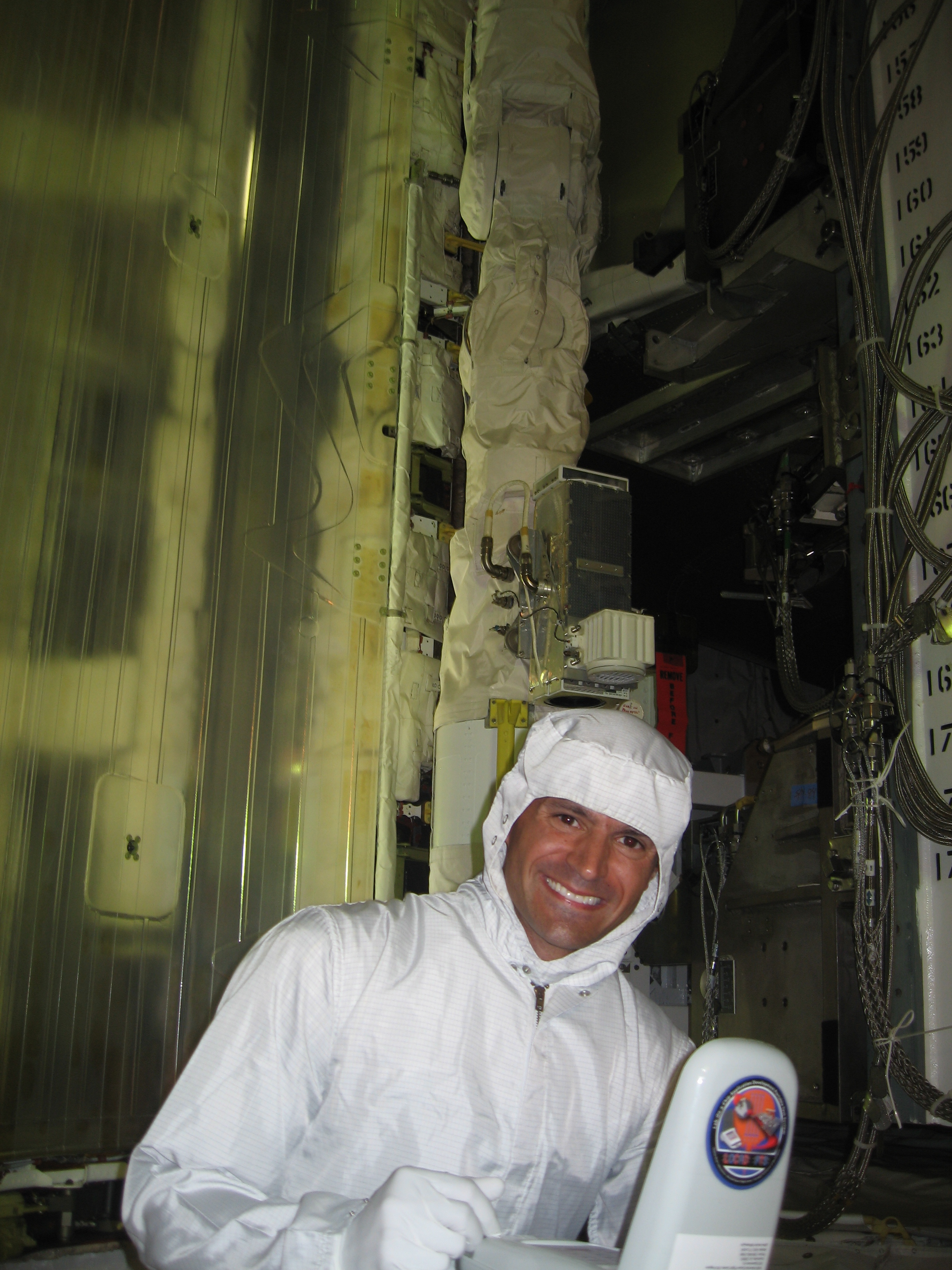
Jake Maule tests 17A MPLM in Shuttle payload bay (August 7, 2009).

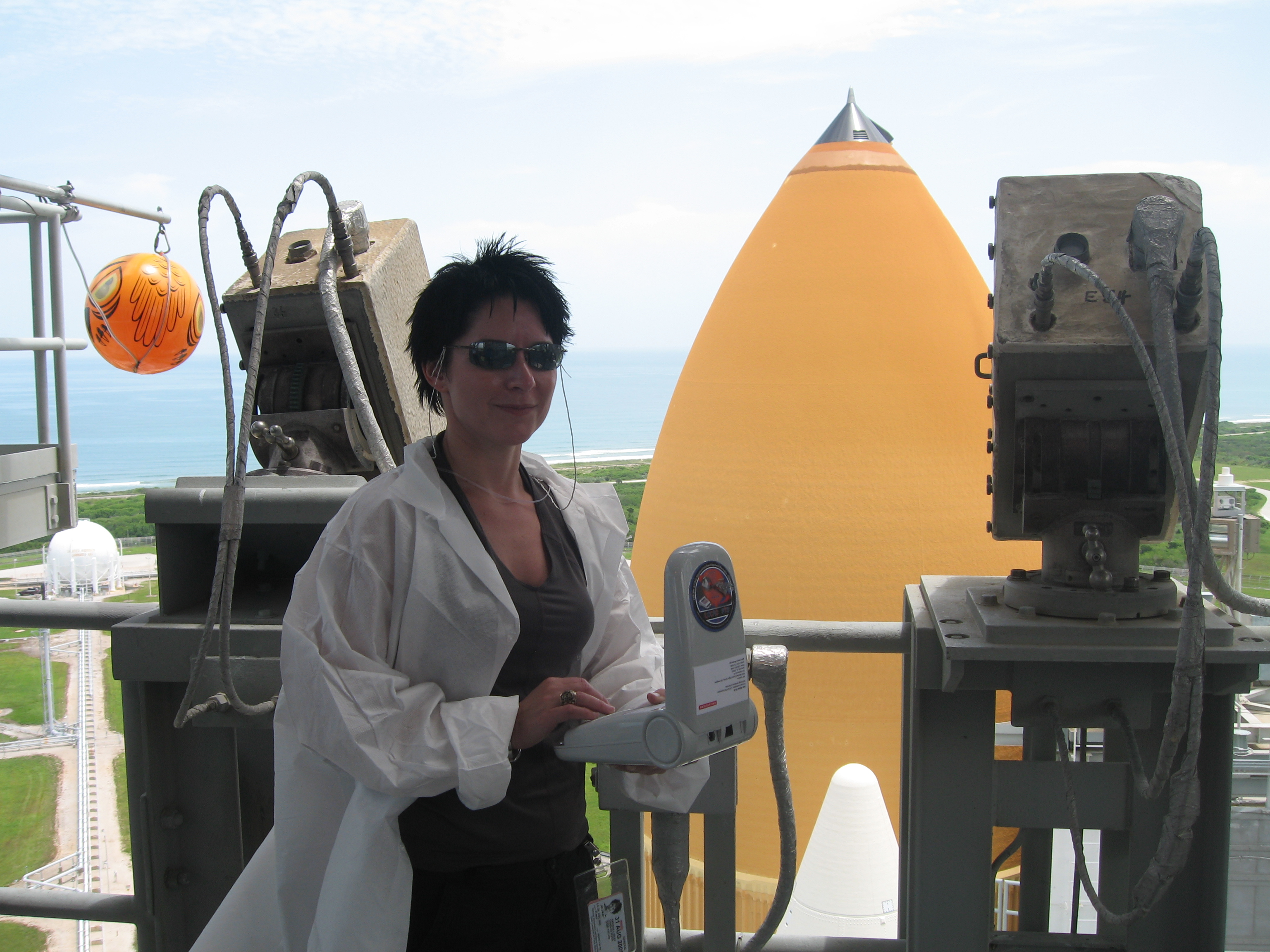
Karissa West performs microbial survey of Pad 39A (August 7, 2009).
