= Don Eyles =

American computer engineer at NASA

- Education: Boston University, Bachelor of Science, Mathematics - 1966
- Known for: Saving Apollo 14 mission from abort

Don Eyles is a retired computer engineer who worked on the computer systems in the Apollo Lunar Module vehicle. As a young engineer during the lunar landing on Lunar Module Eagle on 20 July 1969 he assisted with a series of computer alarms caused by CPU time being drained by the rendezvous radar (RR) interface, which could have caused the mission to be aborted.

== Apollo missions ==
Eyles was educated at Boston University where he earned a bachelor of science in mathematics. In 1966, at age 23, Eyles was hired by Draper Laboratory. He helped program the onboard computer for the Apollo Guidance Program Section where he worked with MIT, and other researchers, on the Apollo Guidance Computer.

During the Apollo missions Eyles worked on the computer systems, programming for Jack Garman, advising flight controllers in Mission Control on the operation of spacecraft computer systems and prior to the Apollo 11 mission he helped program operations for how flight controllers could react to a computer error code.

There were a number of errors with the computer system during the mission. One was diagnosed as the rendezvous radar being on (which was correct according to the checklist), causing the computer to process data from both the rendezvous and landing radars at the same time. Eyles concluded in a 2005 Guidance and Control Conference paper that the problem was due to a hardware design bug previously seen during testing of the first uncrewed LM in Apollo 5. Having the rendezvous radar on (so that it was warmed up in case of an emergency landing abort) should have been irrelevant to the computer, but an electrical phasing mismatch between two parts of the rendezvous radar system could cause the stationary antenna to appear to the computer as dithering back and forth between two positions, depending upon how the hardware randomly powered up. The extra spurious cycle stealing, as the rendezvous radar updated an involuntary counter, caused the computer alarms.

During the Apollo 14 mission, Eyles assisted when a faulty switch could have sent a spurious command to the onboard computer. According to a Rolling Stone article published in 1971 "The switch tells the on-board computer to reverse the engines — blasting the Module away from the moon, back into orbit. On the Apollo 14 flight, the switch accidentally jammed and would have told the computer to reverse the Module's course despite the fact that the astronauts wanted to complete the descent. "We had to write a new program that would make the computer not see the switch," said Eyles.
