= Jack Garman =

American computer engineer (1944–2016)

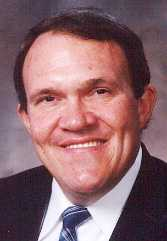
- Born: John Royer Garman; September 11, 1944; Oak Park, Illinois, U.S.
- Died: September 20, 2016 (aged 72) near Houston, Texas, U.S.
- Education: University of Michigan, B.S. 1966
- Known for: Saving Apollo 11 mission from abort

John Royer Garman (September 11, 1944 – September 20, 2016) was a computer engineer, former senior NASA executive and key figure of the Apollo 11 lunar landing. As a young specialist on duty during the final descent stage on 20 July 1969 he dealt with a series of computer alarms which could have caused the mission to be aborted.

== Early life ==
Garman was born September 11, 1944, in Oak Park, Illinois, and attended the University of Michigan in Ann Arbor. He graduated in 1966 with a Bachelor of Science degree in Engineering Physics and a specialty in Computing.

== NASA career ==
In 1966, at age 21, Garman was hired by NASA. He chose to specialize in onboard computing and was assigned to the Apollo Guidance Program Section where he worked with MIT, supervising the design and testing of the Apollo Guidance Computer.

During the Apollo missions Garman worked in a support role, advising flight controllers in Mission Control on the operation of spacecraft computer systems. A few months before the Apollo 11 mission he suggested that simulation supervisors at Mission Control test how flight controllers might react to a computer error code. Guidance officer Steve Bales responded to the simulated error by calling an abort, which was found to be a needless reaction for that particular code.

Gene Kranz told Garman: 'I want you to study and write down every possible program alarm whether they can happen or not.' Garman made a handwritten list of every computer alarm code that could occur along with the correct reaction to each of them and put it under the plexiglass on his desk.

=== 1202 ===
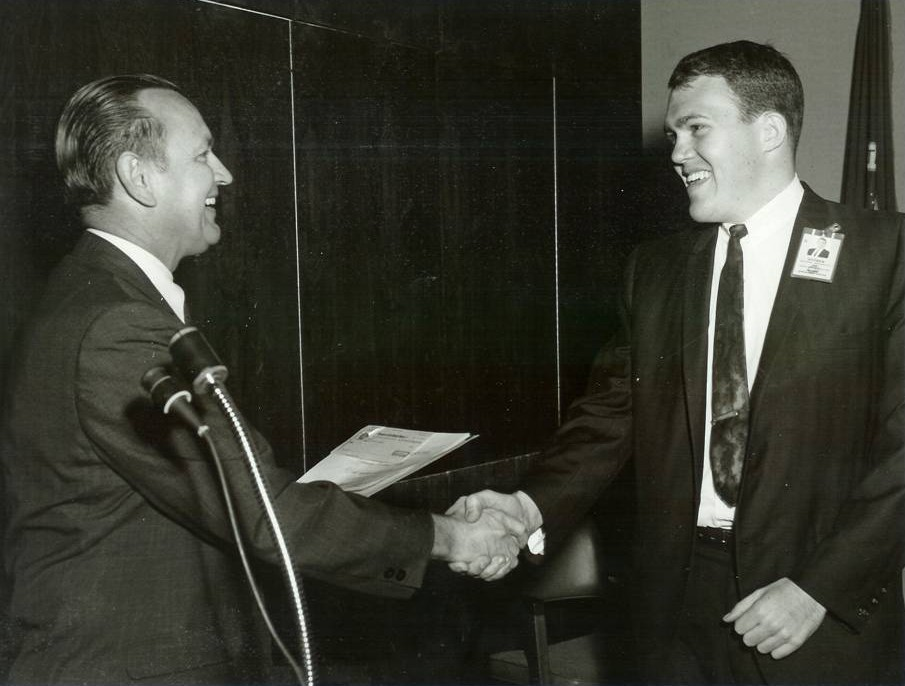
Jack Garman receives an award from Chris Kraft for his role in the Apollo 11 landing.

A design oversight with the Apollo Lunar Module Eagle's rendezvous radar led to a near-abort during the Apollo 11 landing, according to engineer Don Eyles.

The radar's Coupling Data Units (CDU), which provided the interface between the radar's hardware and the LM's onboard guidance computer, were powered by a 28-volt 800 Hz power supply, and a separate 28-volt 800 Hz power supply sent energy to the radar's Attitude, Translation, and Control assembly (ATCA) (which physically oriented the Lunar Module). The two power supplies were supposed to operate in phase lock with each other. However, likely due to inexact language in the LM's design documentation, the system was constructed such that while the two power supplies would always operate at the same frequency and in a fixed phase relationship, no provision was made to ensure the two supplies were aligned and putting out the same phase at the same time.

When the LM's rendezvous radar (which tracked the still-orbiting Command/Service Module (CSM)) was powered up during Apollo 11's descent (a step designed to lessen the crew's workload in case of an abort), the radar's CDUs were energized and took stock of the state of the attached ATCA assembly. By chance, the power-up happened at a moment when the CDU's 800 Hz power supply happened to produce energy that wasn't phase aligned with the ATCA's power (a power-up a fraction of a second earlier or later would have resulted in aligned phases and no problems). The CDUs used their 800 Hz power as a reference signal for interpreting the ATCA's position and orientation, and because the signals from the ATCA were out of phase, this produced readings that were far out of range from what the CDUs expected.

This in turn caused the CDUs to issue interrupts to the guidance computer—12,800 interrupts per second, which consumed about 15% of the computer's available compute time. As the rest of the landing tasks were consuming about 85% of the computer's time, the computer ran out of time to process all of its queued jobs in a single cycle. As scheduled jobs in the computer failed to complete in time, the programs competed for core set memory and vector accumulator registers; eventually, one and then the other were exhausted, and the LM's guidance computer began sounding program alarms and resetting.

The first was a "1202" alarm, indicating an executive overflow and an exhaustion of core sets. Several seconds after the first alarm Neil Armstrong, with some concern apparent in his voice, said, "Give us a reading on the 1202 program alarm." Meanwhile, given his knowledge of the computer systems, Garman had already advised Steve Bales that the computer could be relied upon to function adequately so long as the alarms did not become continuous. Bales, who as guidance officer had to quickly decide whether to abort the mission over these alarms, trusted Garman's judgment and informed flight director Kranz. Within seconds this decision was relayed through CAPCOM to the astronauts and the flight continued.

There were several additional alarms of the same type (both 1202 and also 1201, which indicated a vector accumulator area exhaustion), and then the crew was able to stop them from recurring by changing the landing procedure slightly to reduce the computer's tasks. Apollo 11 went on to land successfully and Garman received an award from NASA for his role in the mission. Bales later recalled, "Quite frankly, Jack, who had these things memorized said, 'that's okay', before I could even remember which group it was in.” Garman’s quick reactions and in-depth knowledge led others on his team to give him the nickname "Gar-Flash".

=== IT and senior management ===
After the Apollo program, Garman and center director Chris Kraft collaborated in the then-new Spacecraft Software Division where Garman worked on Space Shuttle software, including the Flight Computer Operating System (FCOS) and the high-level programming language HAL/S. From 1986 through 1988 he worked at NASA Headquarters in Washington, D.C. as director of information systems services in the Space Station Program Office. Returning to Johnson Space Center in 1988 he held various senior positions in information systems, finally serving as Chief Information Officer of Johnson Space Center from 1994 through 2000.

== Later career ==
In 2000, Garman left NASA and became a part of the OAO Corporation. Two years later OAO was bought by Lockheed Martin and Garman became Lockheed Martin's technical director of NASA services, in charge of technical support for the company's contractual activities with NASA.

== Personal life ==
For his service to the program, Garman was honored with numerous NASA awards, including two exceptional service medals. In 1970, Garman was part of the Apollo 13 team awarded the Presidential Medal of Freedom by President Richard Nixon.

Garman was married to the former Susan Hallmark of Los Angeles; they had two daughters. Garman died near Houston, Texas, of bone marrow cancer on September 20, 2016, at the age of 72.

== See also ==
- Margaret Hamilton
