= Payload Operations and Integration Center =

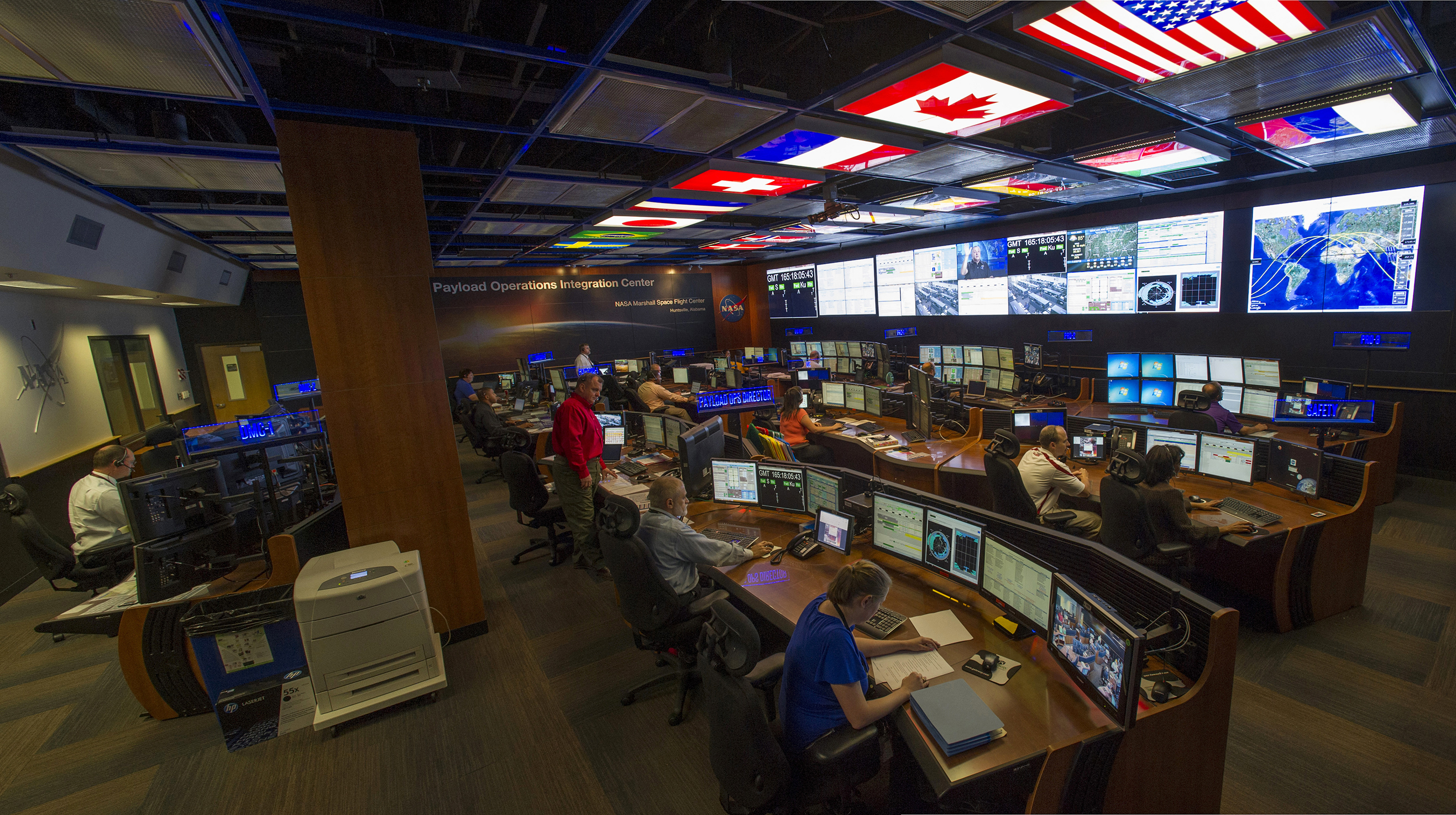
The Payload Operations Control Room in the Huntsville Operations Support Center, Marshall Space Flight Center

The Payload Operations and Integration Center (POIC), part of the Huntsville Operations Support Center (HOSC), callsign Huntsville, or the Payload Operations Center, is a National Aeronautics and Space Administration (NASA) facility located at the Marshall Space Flight Center in Huntsville, Alabama. It serves as headquarters for science operations across multiple NASA programs, including the International Space Station (ISS) and the Artemis program, working in conjunction with other mission control centers. The POIC links Earth-bound researchers and developers from around the world with their experiments and astronauts on various missions. The POIC is led, in real-time operations, by the Payload Operations Director (POD), serving as the central authority between the POIC FCT and other centers and partners.

For the ISS, the POIC works in conjunction with the ISS Mission Control Center in Houston, Texas. Its responsibilities include facilitating scientific research conducted on the station. For the Artemis program, the POIC supports science payloads and experiments on Orion, HLS, Gateway, the lunar surface, and other deep space missions.

The everyday tasks performed at the center during the life of the ISS include:

- Integrating research requirements
- Planning science missions
- Ensuring the safe execution of research
- Integrating the crew and ground team training, and research mission timelines
- Managing use of space station payload resources
- Handling science communications with the crew
- Managing command and data transmissions to and from the orbiting research center

The ISS Payload Operations Center is staffed around the clock by three shifts of flight controllers.

== Payload Operations Center ==
=== ISS POIC Flight Control Team ===
A total of eight flight controllers staff the Payload Operations Center front room. They are:

==== Payload Operations Director (POD) ====
The POD manages day-to-day operations of payloads on board the space station. This position is the single point-of-authority to the International Space Station Mission Control Center Flight Director in Houston for all of NASA's payload operations. The POD oversees team members responsible for managing payload mission planning, ground commanding of space station payloads, communications with the crew, use of the payload support system, the video system and the data systems. The POD ensures compliance with established safety requirements, flight rules and payload regulations. The POD also leads the review and approval of all change requests to the timeline.

==== Operations Controller (OC) ====
The Operations Controller leads a team that is responsible for maintaining the daily payload work assignments; ensuring scheduled research activities are accomplished safely and on time, and managing and tracking available resources.

The OC leads resolution of NASA payload anomalies, and monitors troubleshooting of on board systems to identify possible impacts to payload operations. The position assesses change requests for impacts to the current science timeline, payload hardware assets and resources required for science such as crew time and electrical power. The OC also is responsible for evaluating requests by scientists for changes to the experiment timeline, and then implementing changes to the science operations plan on board.

==== Payload Rack Officer (PRO) ====
The PRO is responsible for the configuration of ExPRESS payload racks in the International Space Station's US Lab, JEM, and Columbus modules, and for coordinating the configuration of systems resources to all NASA payload racks. When a new payload is installed, the PRO configures the rack interfaces to properly support the payload. For existing payloads, the PRO configures the EXPRESS racks to power payloads on or off, monitors the health and status of both the payload and the rack and if necessary, coordinates troubleshooting of the payload support structure and payload interfaces.

The PRO also is responsible for managing all ground commanding of U. S. payload systems and experiments on board the International Space Station. The PRO manages the command system, receives and sends command files to the mass storage device and configures the system to allow flight controllers in the Payload Operations Center and remote users to send commands to their equipment on the space station.

==== Data Management Coordinator (DMC) ====
The Data Management Coordinator is responsible for command, control, data handling, communications and tracking for science payloads on the space station. The DMC manages the integrated high data rate (K_{u}-band) communications link between the ground and the station. This position manages data system traffic, downlink video, assures ground data quality with NASA users, and assesses data system change requests. The DMC ensures that the data system is properly configured to support payload operations. The DMC also is responsible for managing video coverage of research activity on the station. The DMC monitors, configures and coordinates the use of the video system.

==== Payload Communications Manager (PAYCOM) ====
The PAYCOM, using the call sign, "Huntsville," is the prime communicator with the International Space Station astronaut crew on payload matters. The PAYCOM is responsible for enabling researchers around-the-world to talk directly with the crew about their experiments, and for managing payload conferences. Additionally, the PAYCOM reviews requests for changes to payload activity to assess their impact on the crew.

==== POIC Stowage ====
The POIC Stowage console position is responsible for tracking the stowage locations of payload hardware, tools, and items on the International Space Station. This console position develops products that ensure the ISS crew knows where to locate every item they need for their day to day experiments, and helps maintain an inventory database for accurate tracking of those items. They also support the crew by helping them locate missing items. When the crew calls down and reports an item lost, the POIC Stowage console conducts investigations using video, imagery, and many other resources to come up with alternate search locations. The Stowage Team maintains a high level of situational awareness and knowledge of the current layout of station to ensure the crew can always find what they need to perform payload ops successfully.

==== Marshall GC (GC) ====
The Marshall GC (Marshall Ground Control) is responsible for troubleshooting ground system issues as the ground system expert. Marshall GC leads troubleshooting of real time commanding, telemetry, communication, and facility issues.

Other duties that Marshall GC perform are coordinating payload video restrictions, space-to-ground enablement, space-to-ground restrictions, and ground system maintenance. If payload developers have any ground system issues, Marshall GC is the real time coordinator to resolve such issues.

As the ground system expert, Marshall GC is the HOSC interface for Backup Control Center (BCC) operations.

==== Timeline Change Officer (TCO) ====
The Timeline Change Officer (TCO) serves as the real-time expert on all NASA payload planning-related information for the International Space Station. Coordinating with NASA control centers, International Partners, and NASA Payload Developers, the TCO bridges the gap between long range planning and execution of the plan on board by the crew. The TCO team supports real-time operations five days a week, sixteen hours per day; in addition, short term planning operations are supported five days a week, eight hours per day.

=== Artemis Payload Operations ===
With NASA's transition to the Artemis program, POIC expanded its mission to support science payload operations beyond low Earth orbit, including aboard the Orion spacecraft, the Human Landing System (HLS), and other Artemis programs. To support this mission, POIC established a dedicated Artemis flight control team (FCT) operating alongside the existing ISS team.

The Artemis payload operations team is led by the Payload Operations Director (POD) and includes specialized console positions designed for the unique operational characteristics of deep space crewed missions, including extended communication delays, constrained crew schedules, and multi-vehicle mission profiles. Artemis FCT positions draw from ISS operational heritage but are restructured and renamed to reflect the distinct demands of Artemis mission phases.

==== Payload Operations Director (POD) ====
The POD retains the same authority in Artemis operations as in ISS operations, serving as the primary interface to the Artemis Flight Director at Johnson Space Center (JSC).

== See also ==
- Flight controller
- Human spaceflight programs
- Space Shuttle program
- International Space Station program
