= Flight controller =

Person who aids in spaceflight activities

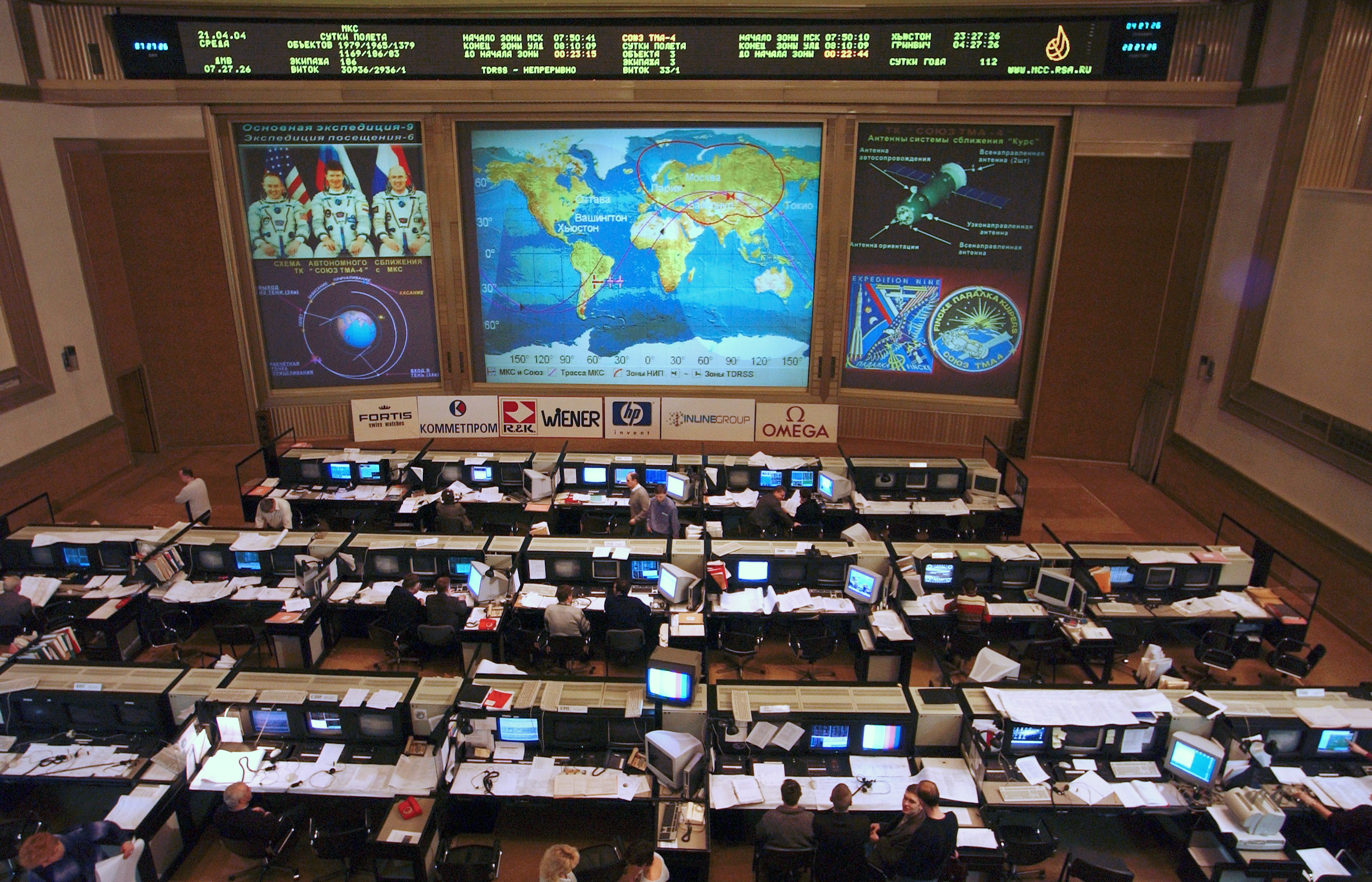
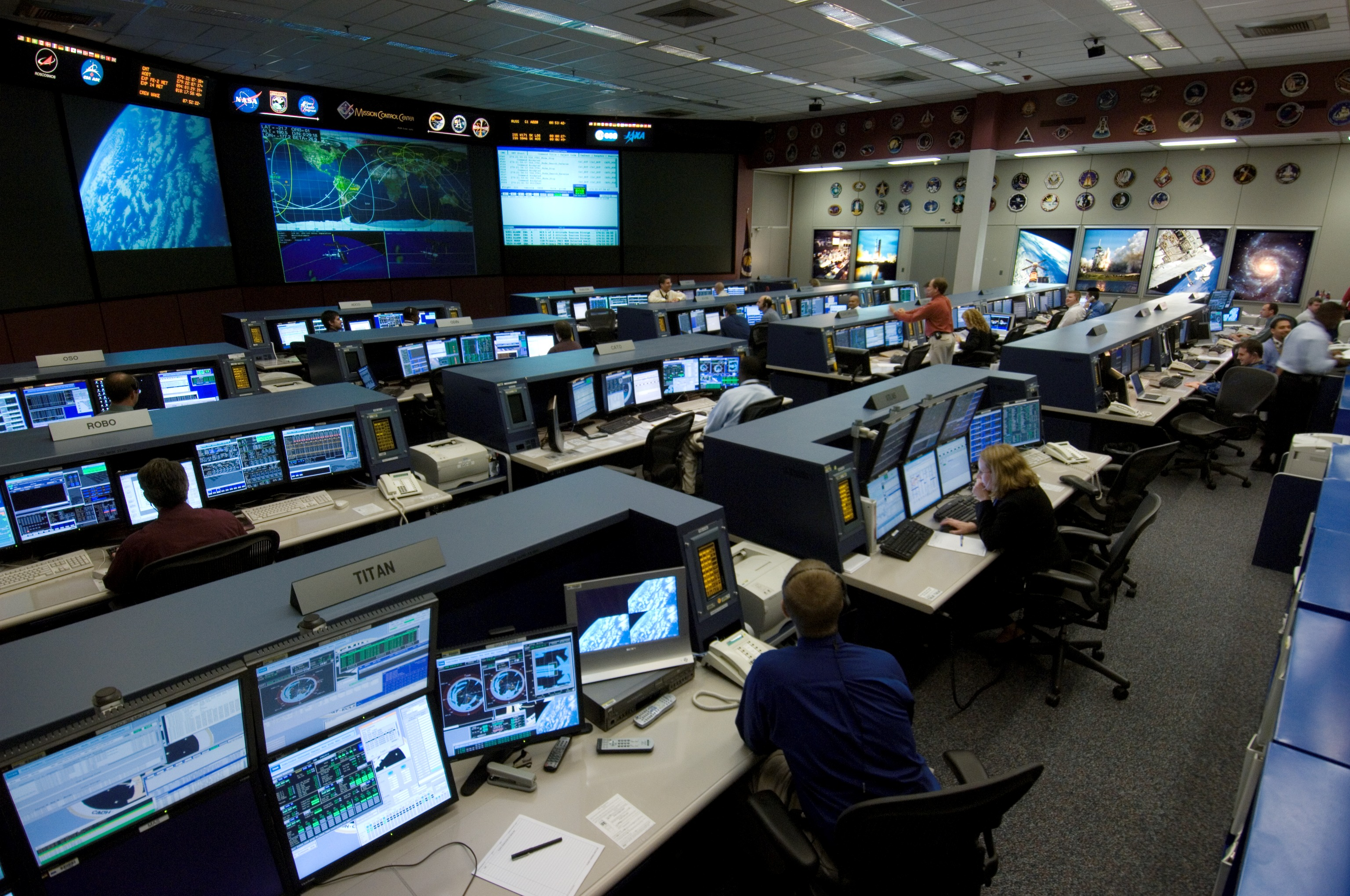
International Space Station control rooms in Russia and in the United States.

Flight controllers are personnel who aid space flight by working in mission control centers such as NASA's Christopher C. Kraft Jr. Mission Control Center or ESA's European Space Operations Centre. Flight controllers work at computer consoles and use telemetry to monitor various technical aspects of a space mission in real-time. Each controller is an expert in a specific area and constantly communicates with additional experts in the "back room". The flight director, who leads the flight controllers, monitors the activities of a team of flight controllers, and has overall responsibility for success and safety.

== NASA's flight controllers ==
The room where the flight controllers work was called the mission operations control room (MOCR, pronounced "moh-ker"), and now is called the flight control room (FCR, pronounced "ficker"). The controllers are experts in individual systems, and make recommendations to the flight director involving their areas of responsibility. Any controller may call for an abort if the circumstances require it. Before significant events, the flight director will "go around the room", polling each controller for a go/no go decision, a procedure also known as a launch status check. If all factors are good, each controller calls for a "go" but if there is a problem requiring a hold or an abort, the call is "no go". Another form of this is stay/no stay, when the spacecraft has completed a maneuver and has now "parked" in relation to another body, including spacecraft, orbiting the Earth or the Moon, or the lunar landings.

Controllers in MOCR/FCR are supported by the "backrooms", teams of flight controllers located in other parts of the building or even at remote facilities. The backroom was formerly called the staff support room (SSR), and is now called the multi-purpose support room (MPSR, pronounced "mipser"). Backroom flight controllers are responsible for the details of their assigned system and for making recommendations for actions needed for that system. "Frontroom" flight controllers are responsible for integrating the needs of their system into the larger needs of the vehicle and working with the rest of the flight control team (FCT) to develop a cohesive plan of action, even if that plan is not necessarily in the best interests of the system they are responsible for. Within the chain of command of the MCC, information and recommendations flow from the backroom to the frontroom to Flight, and then, potentially, to the on board crew. Generally, a MOCR/FCR flight control team is made up of the more seasoned flight controllers than the SSR/MPSR, though senior flight controllers cycle back to support in the backroom periodically. One example of the usefulness of this system occurred during the descent of the Apollo 11 Lunar Module Eagle, when "1202" and "1201" program alarms came from the LM. GUIDO Steve Bales, not sure whether to call for an abort, trusted the experts in the guidance backroom, especially Jack Garman, who told him that the problem was a computer overload, but could be ignored if it was intermittent. Bales called "Go!", Flight Director Gene Kranz accepted the call and the mission continued to success. Without the support of the backroom, a controller might make a bad call based on faulty memory or information not readily available to the person on the console. The nature of quiescent operations aboard the International Space Station (ISS) today is such that the full team is not required for 24/7/365 support. FCR flight controllers accept responsibility for operations without MPSR support most of the time, and the MPSR is only staffed for high-intensity periods of activity, such as joint Shuttle/ISS missions.

The flight controllers in the FCR and MPSR are further supported by hardware and software designers, analysts and engineering specialists in other parts of the building or remote facilities. These extended support teams have more detailed analysis tools and access to development and test data that is not readily accessible to the flight control team. These support teams were referred to by the name of their room in Mission Control, the mission operations integration room (MOIR), and are now collectively referred to by the name of their current location, the mission evaluation room (MER). While the flight controllers and their backrooms are responsible for real-time decision making, the MOIR/MER provides the detailed data and history needed to solve longer-term issues.

Uncrewed U.S. space missions also have flight controllers but are managed from separate organizations, either the Jet Propulsion Laboratory or the Johns Hopkins University Applied Physics Laboratory for deep-space missions or Goddard Space Flight Center for near-Earth missions.

Each flight controller has a unique call sign, which describes the position's responsibilities. The call sign and responsibility refer to the particular console, not just the person, since missions are managed around the clock and with each shift change a different person takes over the console.

Flight controller responsibilities have changed over time, and continue to evolve. New controllers are added, and tasks are reassigned to other controllers to keep up with changing technical systems. For example, the EECOM handled command and service module communication systems through Apollo 10, which was afterward assigned to a new position called INCO.

=== Responsibility ===
Flight controllers are responsible for the success of the mission and for the lives of the astronauts under their watch. The Flight Controllers' Creed states that they must "always be aware that suddenly and unexpectedly we may find ourselves in a role where our performance has ultimate consequences." Well-known actions taken by flight controllers include:

- The Apollo 11 Lunar Module computer was overloaded because the astronauts forgot to switch off their upper-stage radar before switching on the downward-pointing radar. Guidance officer Steve Bales had only a few seconds to determine whether it was safe to land anyway or to abort the mission mere feet above the Moon. Bales was later honored for his role in the mission, when he was selected to accept the NASA Group Achievement Award from President Richard Nixon on behalf of the Apollo 11 mission operations team.
- During the launch of Apollo 12, the Saturn V was struck by lightning which knocked out all telemetry and multiple command module systems. Seconds before mission abort, EECOM controller John Aaron determined that switching to the backup electrical power distribution telemetry conditioning would reveal the true nature of the issue.
- During Space Shuttle mission STS-51-F, a main engine failed during ascent to orbit. Subsequently, indications were received of a second engine beginning to fail, which would have caused a mission abort, possibly including loss of the shuttle. Booster officer Jenny Howard Stein determined that the anomalous readings on the second engine were a sensor error and not an engine problem. At her direction the crew inhibited the sensor, which saved the mission and possibly the crew.

== Common flight control positions ==
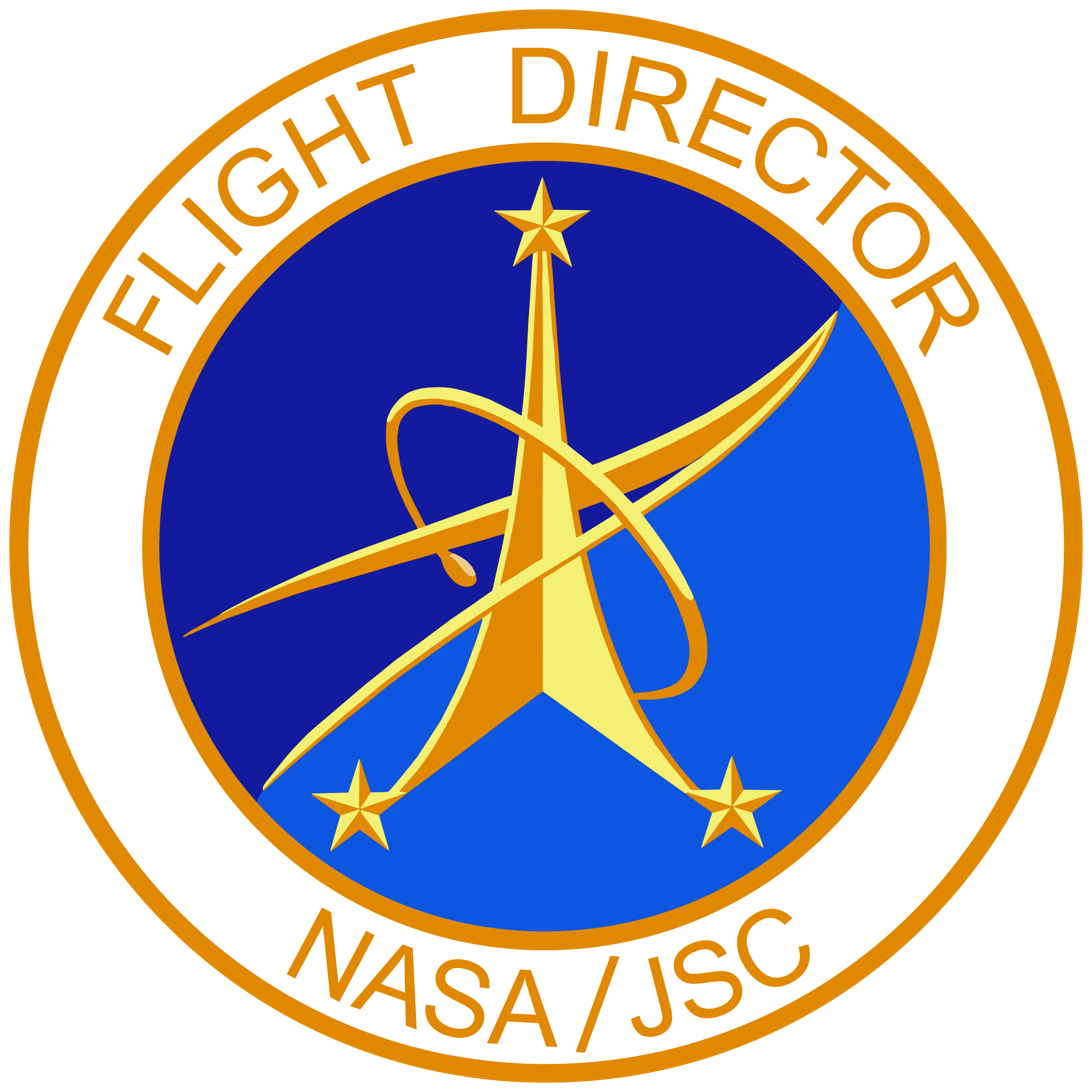
Flight Director's insignia at JSC

There are some positions that have and will serve the same function in every vehicle's flight control team. The group of individuals serving in those positions may be different, but they will be called the same thing and serve the same function.

=== Flight director ===
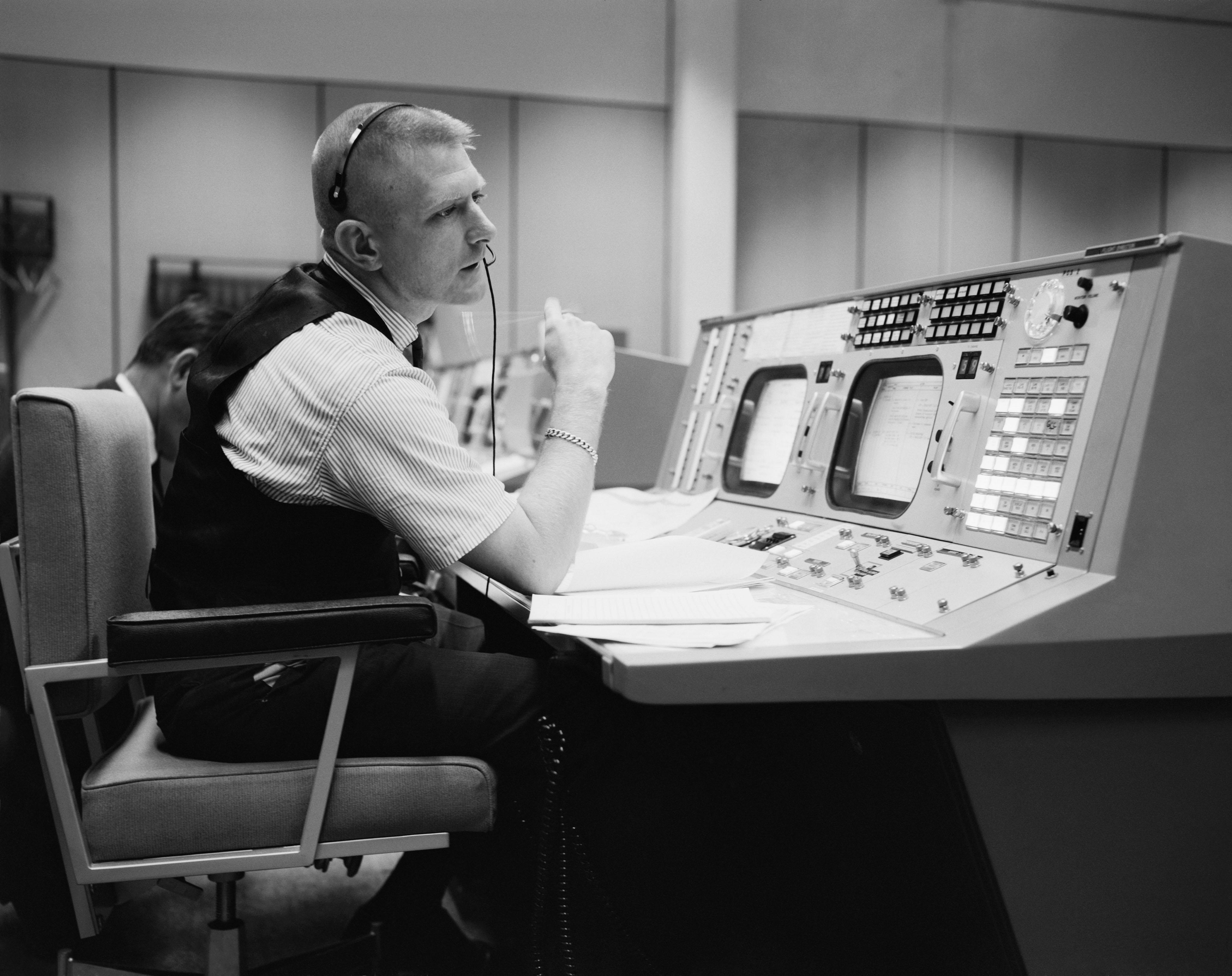
NASA chief flight director Gene Kranz at his console on May 30, 1965, in the Mission Operations Control Room, Mission Control Center, Houston.

Leads the flight control team. Flight has overall operational responsibility for missions and payload operations and for all decisions regarding safe, expedient flight. This person monitors the other flight controllers, remaining in constant verbal communication with them via intercom channels called "loops".

=== Flight operations directorate (FOD) ===
Is a representative of the senior management chain at JSC, and is there to help the flight director make those decisions that have no safety-of-flight consequences, but may have cost or public perception consequences. The FOD cannot overrule the flight director during a mission. The former mission operations directorate (MOD) position was renamed FOD when the flight crew operations directorate (FCOD) was merged back with MOD beginning in August 2014.

=== Spacecraft communicator (CAPCOM) ===
Generally, only the spacecraft communicator communicates directly with the crew of a crewed space flight. The acronym dates back to Project Mercury when the spacecraft was originally termed a "capsule." NASA felt it important for all communication with the astronauts in space to pass through a single individual in the Mission Control Center. That role was first designated the capsule communicator or CAPCOM and was filled by another astronaut, often one of the backup- or support-crew members. NASA believes that an astronaut is most able to understand the situation in the spacecraft and pass information in the clearest way.

For long-duration missions there is more than one CAPCOM, each assigned to a different shift team. After control of U.S. spaceflights moved to the Johnson Space Center in the early 1960s, each CAPCOM used the radio call-sign Houston. When non-astronauts are communicating directly with the spacecraft, CAPCOM acts as the communications controller.

As of 2011, due to the shrinking size of the astronaut corps at the end of the Shuttle program, fewer astronauts are available to perform CAPCOM duties, so non-astronauts from the space flight training and flight controller branches also function as CAPCOM during ISS missions, while the role was filled solely by astronauts for the Apollo and Shuttle missions. Astronauts still take the CAPCOM position during critical events such as docking and EVA.

In the context of potential crewed missions to Mars, NASA Ames Research Center has conducted field trials of advanced computer-support for astronaut and remote science teams, to test the possibilities for automating CAPCOM.

=== Other common flight control positions ===
Flight surgeon
The flight surgeon directs all medical activities during the mission – monitors crew health via telemetry, provides crew consultation, and advises the flight director. A private communication channel can be established between astronauts and the flight surgeon, to provide doctor–patient confidentiality.

Public affairs officer (PAO)
Provides mission commentary to supplement and explain air-to-ground transmissions and flight control operations to the news media and the public. The individual filling this role is often referred to colloquially as The Voice of Mission Control.

== See also ==
Space centers and mission control center

- Baikonur Cosmodrome (launch control center for Roscosmos in Baikonur, Kazakhstan)
- Beijing Aerospace Command and Control Center (mission control center for the China National Space Administration in Beijing)
- Christopher C. Kraft Jr. Mission Control Center (mission control center for NASA in Houston)
- John H. Chapman Space Centre (robotics mission control center for the Canadian Space Agency in Longueuil, Quebec)
- European Space Operations Centre (mission control center for the European Space Agency in Darmstadt, Germany)
- German Space Operations Center (mission control center for the German Aerospace Center, including Columbus Control Centre for the European Space Agency in Oberpfaffenhofen, Germany)
- Guiana Space Centre (launch control center for the European Space Agency in Kourou, French Guiana)
- Johnson Space Center (mission control center for NASA in Houston, Texas)
- Kennedy Space Center (launch control center for NASA in Cape Canaveral, Florida)
- Payload Operations and Integration Center (located at the Marshall Space Flight Center in Huntsville, Alabama)
- RKA Mission Control Center (mission control center for Roscomos near Moscow Russia)
- Tanegashima Space Center (launch control center for JAXA, Tanegashima Island, Japan)
- Tsukuba Space Center (mission control center for JAXA, Tsukuba, Japan)
