= Go/no-go =

Pass/fail test principle using two conditions

A go/no-go test is a two-step verification process that uses two boundary conditions, or a binary classification. The test is passed only when the go condition has been met and also the no-go condition has failed.

The test gives no information as to the degree of conformance to, or deviation from the boundary conditions. These tests can be used for statistical process control purposes. There are specific SPC tools that use parameter based measurements (e.g., P-charts) for determining the stability of a process.

It has uses in engineering, psychology, military, and manufacturing. For example, a rocket launch status check involves a go/no-go test.

== Uses ==
=== Engineering ===
In engineering the test is traditionally used only to check noncritical parameters where the manufacturing process is believed to be stable and well controlled, and the tolerances are wide compared to the distribution of the parameter.

For example, the preceding launch status checks before a Space Shuttle liftoff had the flight controller perform a go/no-go check on each of the vehicle's critical systems.

=== Psychology ===
In psychology, go/no-go test, developed by neuropsychologist Alexander Luria in 1940-50s is used to measure a participant's capacity for switching between several types of behavioural response ("plasticity") and control of adequacy of response (impulse control and sustained attention). Since the work of Alexander Luria in neuropsychology, such response is linked to the cortical frontal lobes.

For example, a go/no-go test that requires a participant to perform an action given certain stimuli (e.g., press a button) and also inhibit that action under a different set of stimuli (e.g., not press that same button).

=== Military ===
In the United States Army, drills and proficiency evaluation rubrics are based on a go/no-go (pass/fail) system. Evaluations involving numerical scores (such as the physical fitness test) convert raw scores to go/no-go based on cutoffs defined by the particular performance standard for that area. Within a given skills unit, the rubric often specifies go/no-go scoring for each individual item or concept a soldier is expected to be trained and evaluated on. Usually, a soldier must score "go" (i.e. perform satisfactorily) on all sections of an evaluation in order to advance to the next phase of training, pass the course, or attain the particular qualification.

=== Manufacturing ===
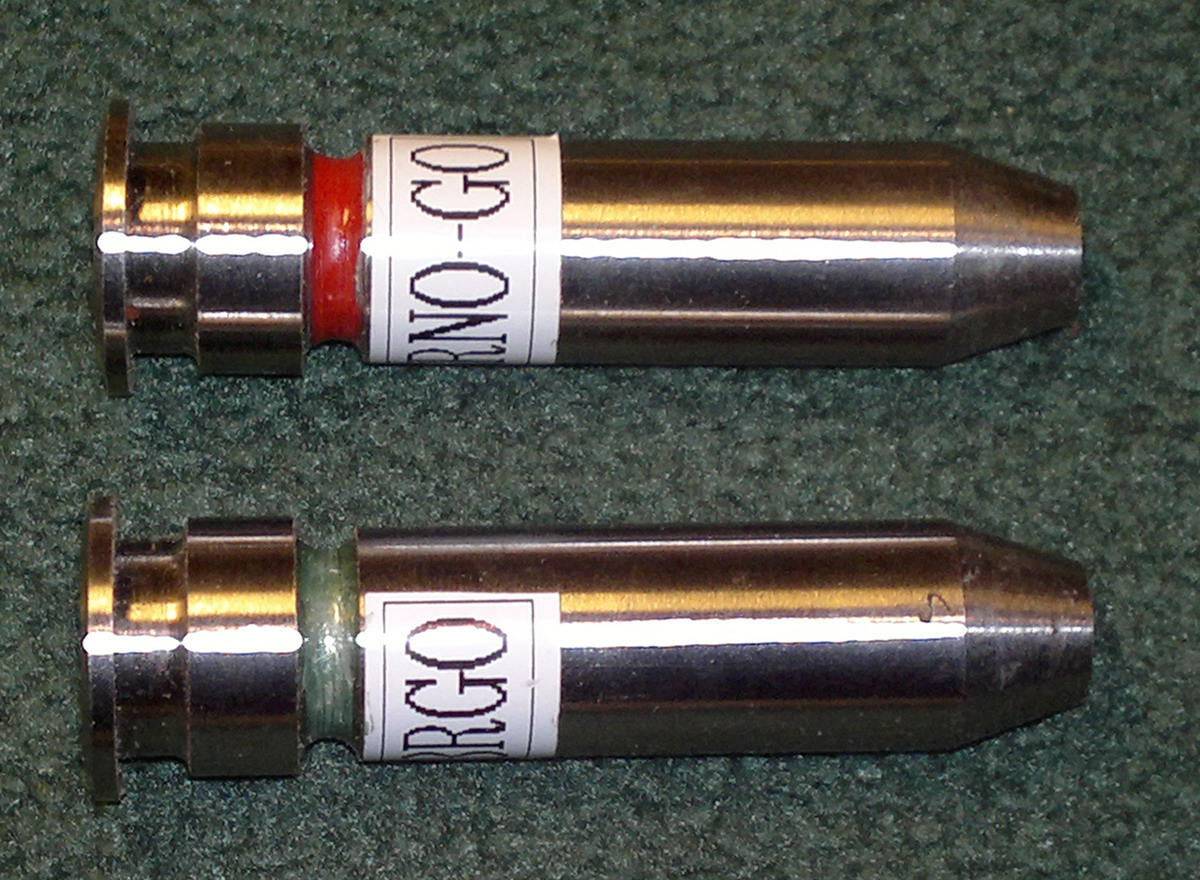
Go and no-go gauges

Go/no-go gauges are encountered in all types of manufacturing. They may measure a physical dimension, e.g. (50 ± 0.01 mm), or a value such as the value of a resistor (100 Ω (ohms) ± 1%). A typical example is a plug gauge.

== See also ==
- Gauge block
- Qualitative property
- Shock detector
- Litmus test (politics)
- Evaluation of binary classifiers
- Confusion matrix
