= Launch Control Center =

Facility at Kennedy Space Center, Florida

- U.S. National Register of Historic Places
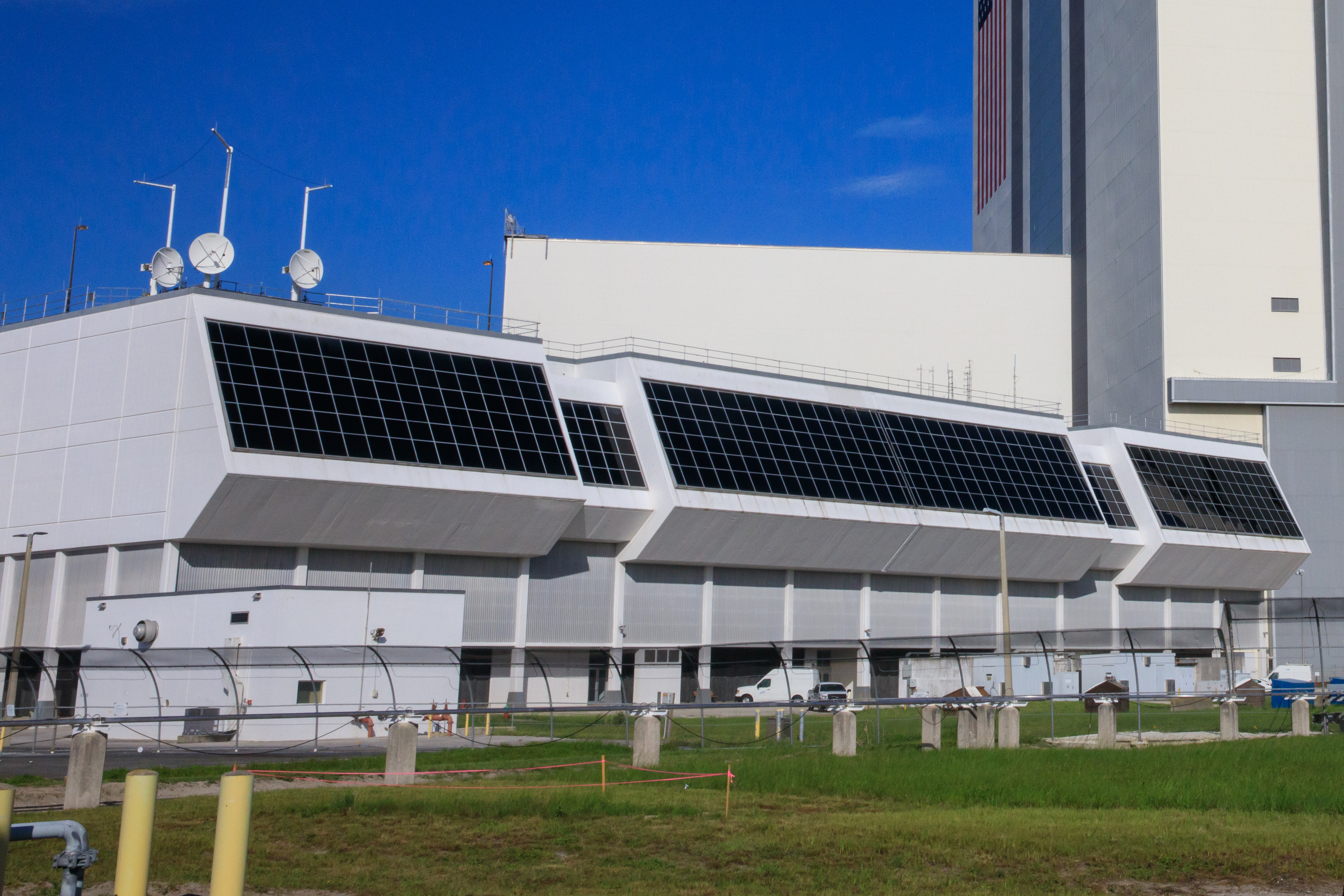
- LC-39 Launch Control Center

- Location within Florida Location within the United States
- Nearest city: Titusville, Florida
- Coordinates: 28°35′7″N 80°38′59″W
- Area: 12,047 m^{2} (129,670 sq ft)
- Built: 1967
- MPS: John F. Kennedy Space Center MPS
- NRHP reference No.: 99001645
- Added to NRHP: January 21, 2000

The Rocco A. Petrone Launch Control Center (commonly known as just the Launch Control Center or LCC) is a four-story building at NASA's Kennedy Space Center on Merritt Island, Florida, used to manage launches of launch vehicles from Kennedy Space Center Launch Complex 39. Attached to the southeast corner of the Vehicle Assembly Building, the LCC contains offices; telemetry, tracking, and instrumentation equipment; and firing rooms.

LCC has conducted launches since the unmanned Apollo 4 (SA-501) launch on November 9, 1967. LCC's first launch with a human crew was Apollo 8 on December 21, 1968. NASA's Space Shuttle program also used LCC. NASA has renovated the center for Space Launch System (SLS) missions, which began in 2022 with Artemis I. In February 2022, the center was renamed after former director of launch operations Rocco A. Petrone.

== Firing rooms ==
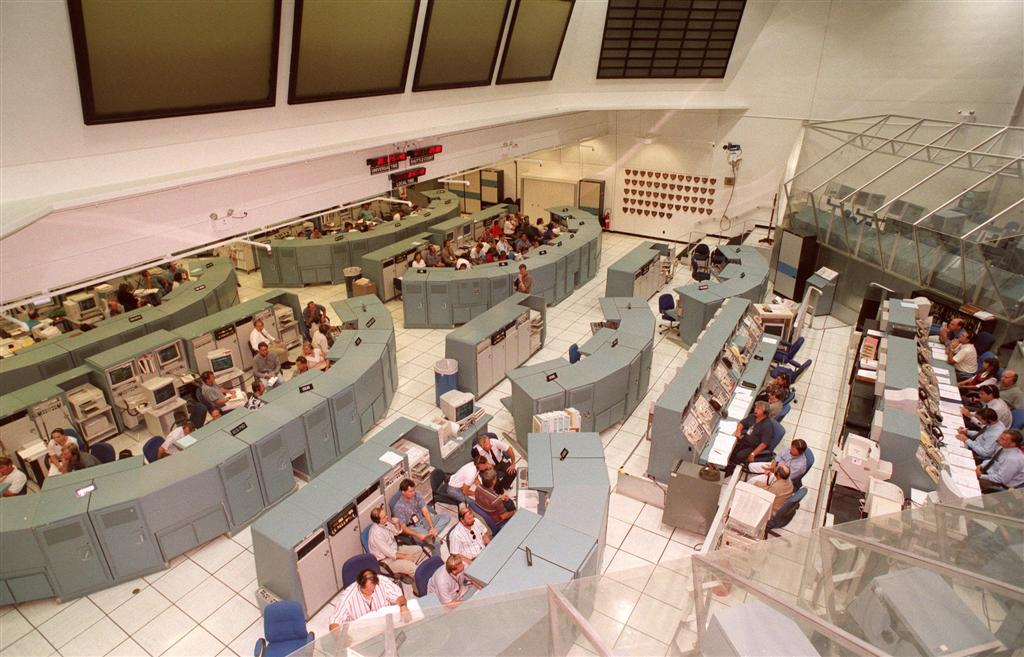
Firing Room 1 configured for Space Shuttle launches

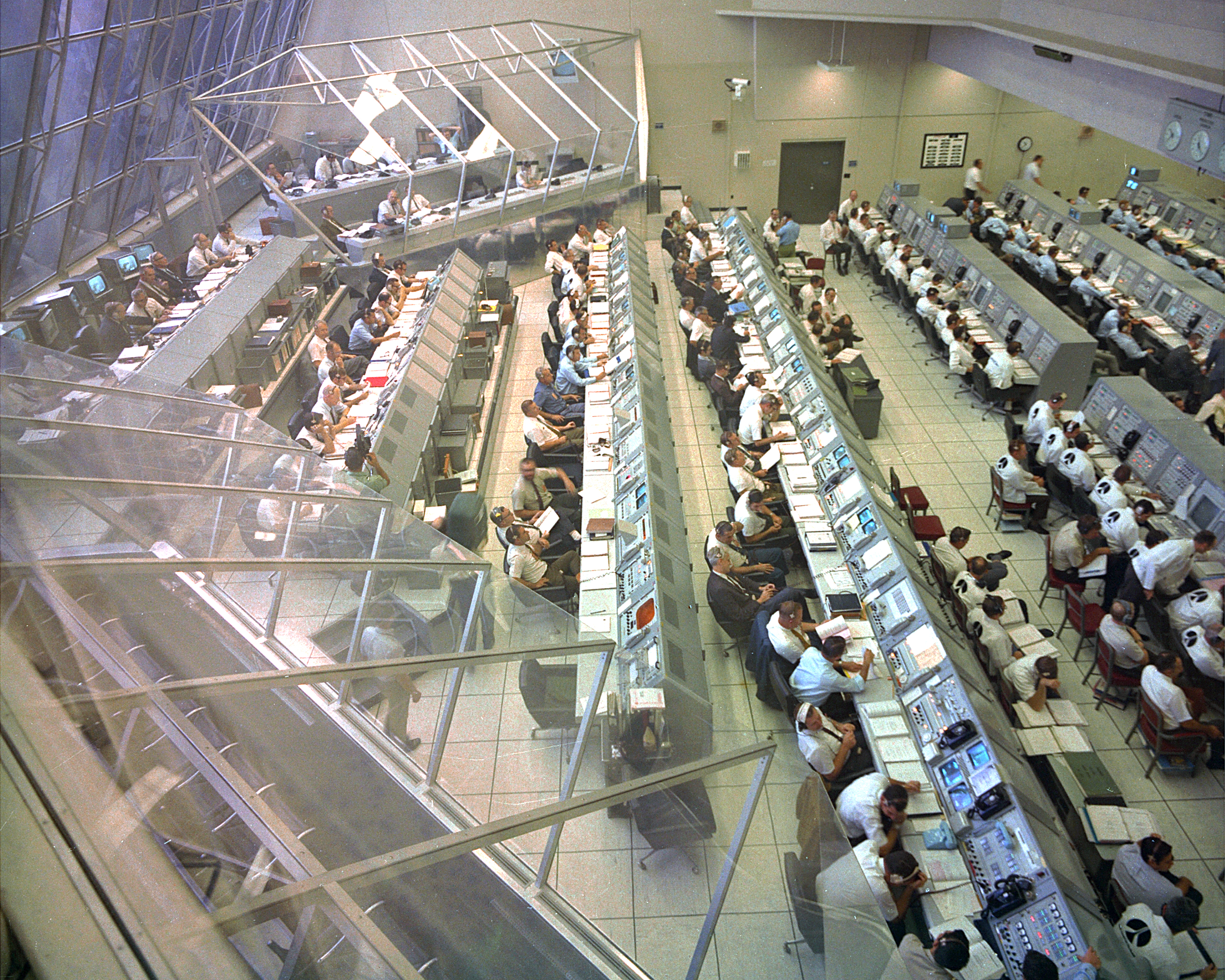
Firing Room 2 as it appeared in the Apollo era

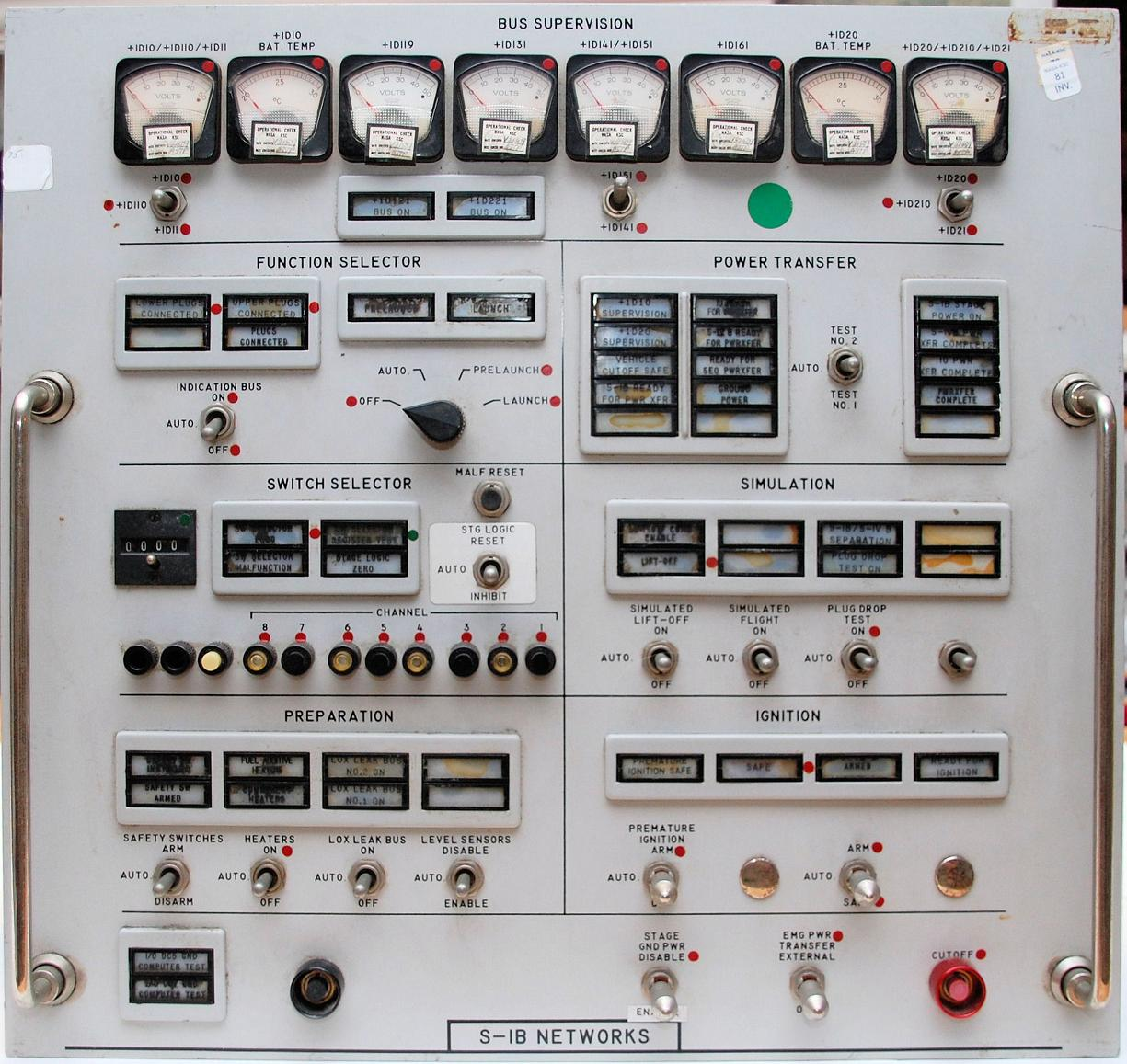
A Saturn I-B control panel from an Apollo-era Firing Room

Launch operations are supervised and controlled from several control rooms known as "firing rooms". The controllers are in control of pre-launch checks, the booster and spacecraft. Once the rocket has cleared the launch tower (usually within the first 10–15 seconds), control is switched over to the mission's mission control center (the Christopher C. Kraft Jr. Mission Control Center at the Johnson Space Center in Houston, Texas for NASA launches or SpaceX Mission Control Center in Hawthorne, California for SpaceX launches.)

Extensive renovation of Firing Room 4 was finished in 2006.

Firing Room 4 was leased by SpaceX and serves as their launch control center for Launch Complex 39A until August 2023 when the company moved into its own facility just before the launch of the Crew-7 mission.

== Key personnel ==
=== Launch Director (LD) ===
The Launch Director is the head of the launch team, and is responsible for making the final "go" or "no go" decision for launch after polling the relevant team members. There have been eight different Space Shuttle launch directors between 1981 and 2011. Since 2016, Charlie Blackwell-Thompson has served as the launch director for SLS/Orion missions as part of the Artemis program.

=== Flow Director (FD) ===
The Flow Director is responsible for the preparation of the spacecraft for launch, and remains in the LCC in an advisory capacity.

=== NASA Test Director (NTD) ===
The NASA Test Director is responsible for all pre-launch testing, whether involving the flight crew, the orbiter, the external tank/solid rocket booster, or ground support equipment. The NTD is also responsible for the safety of all personnel on the pad after fuelling has occurred. Reports to the Launch Director.

=== Orbiter Test Conductor (OTC) ===
The Orbiter Test Conductor is in charge of all pre-flight checkout and testing of the orbiter, and manages the engineers in the firing room who monitor the orbiter's systems. OTC is an employee of a contractor rather than of NASA.

=== Payload Test Conductor (PTC) ===
The Payload Test Conductor is responsible for the pre-flight test and checkout of payloads carried by the orbiter and manages the engineering and test teams responsible for monitoring and controlling payload ground operations. PTC is a contractor member of the Space Shuttle Team.

=== Launch Processing System Coordinator (LPS) ===
The LPS Coordinator monitors and oversees the LPS System; specifically, the desired launch rate, Space Shuttle stacking (assembly), and all safety requirements. This is made possible by the Launch Processing System, or LPS — a highly automated, computer-controlled system that oversees the entire checkout and launch process.

=== Superintendent of Range Operations (SRO) ===
The Superintendent of Range Operations ensures that all tracking and communications systems are ready to support the launch operation as well as ensuring that downrange airspace and splashdown areas remain clear for launch, and monitors weather near the launch site.

=== Ground Launch Sequencer Engineer (CGLS) ===
The Ground Launch Sequencer Engineer is responsible for monitoring the operation of the automated Ground Launch Sequencer system, which controls the countdown from T−9 minutes until launch. After this point through to T−31 seconds, they are in charge of implementing a manual hold if necessary. After T−31 seconds only an automatic cutoff is available. The automatic cutoff recycles the countdown clock to T−20 minutes. Usually this will extend the launch time beyond the launch window causing a scrub and a 24-hour turnaround.

== Gallery ==
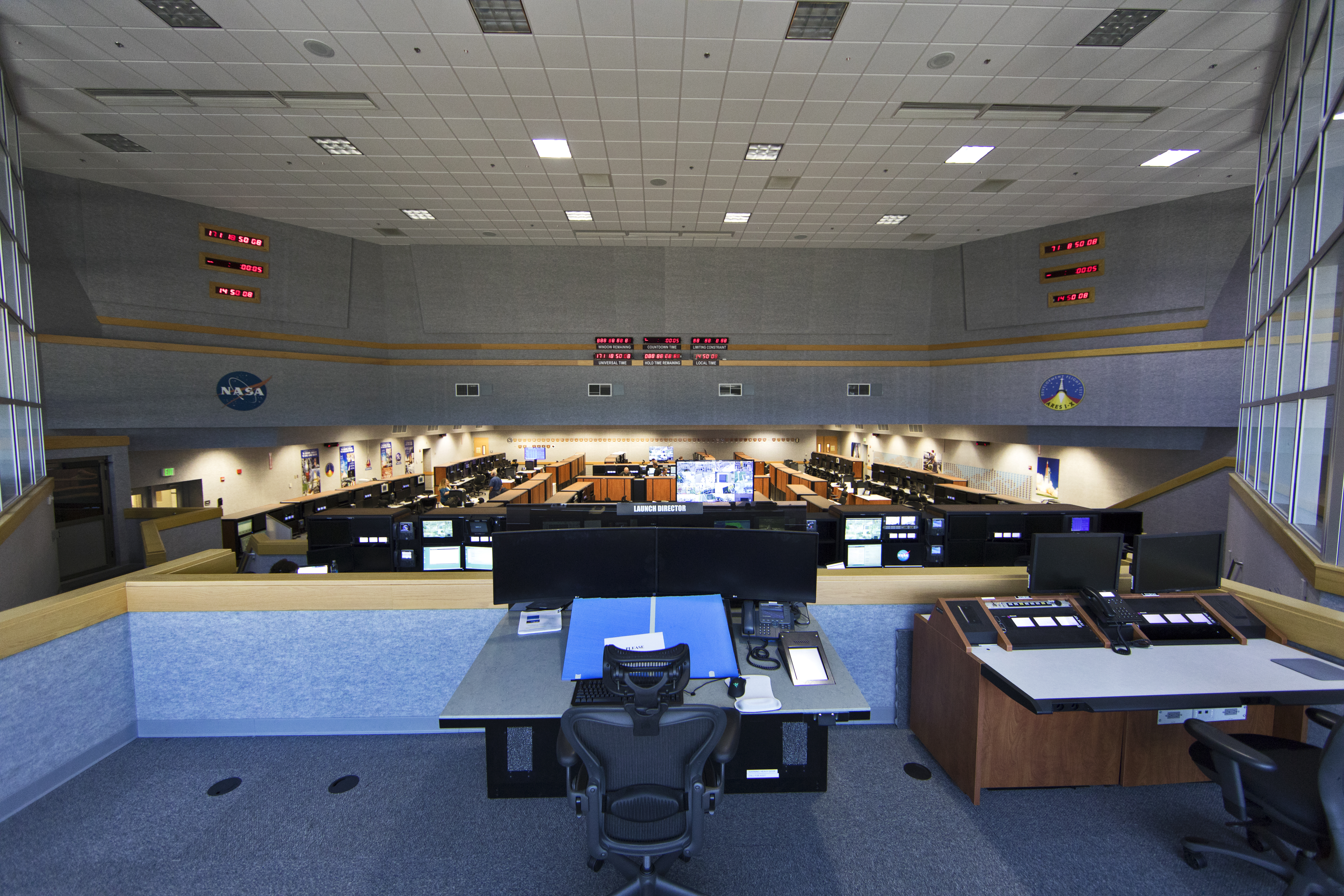
Interior of the recently renovated firing room 1 in 2018.
Wide angle panorama of the Launch Control Center.

== See also ==
- Ground station
- Launch status check
- Mission control center
- Spacecraft naming
