= Launch Processing System =

The Launch Processing System (LPS) is an automated, computer-controlled system at the Kennedy Space Center (KSC) which oversees and coordinates the processing and checkout of systems and components for the Space Shuttle launch vehicle and its payloads. The LPS automatically performs tests on much of the vehicle components as they are being readied for launch, and alerts operators if any anomalies are detected. The LPS also manages the launch countdown events, culminating in a successful launch.

== Function ==
Early in the design of the Space Shuttle program, the expected launch rate was 12 flights per year. The LPS was designed to oversee and manage the parallel processing of multiple orbiters and their subsystems in order to meet this launch schedule. The LPS tracks and manages all components of the Space Shuttle launch vehicle from the time the individual components arrive at KSC, through checkout, integration, testing, installation, and finally culminating in a launch.

Any time a component is functioning, sensors within the component relay data on its performance back to the LPS, which checks these results against the expected normal conditions. If the result is unsatisfactory, the LPS then alerts an operator and provides data as to the nature of the component's performance, so that any fault may be isolated and resolved.

Because the LPS monitors thousands of individual parameters on the Shuttle and support equipment, the number of personnel required in the firing room is less than half of the 450 engineers required for an Apollo program launch.

== Components ==
The LPS is composed of three major subsystems: the Checkout, Control and Monitor Subsystem (CCMS), the Central Data Subsystem (CDS), and the Record and Playback Subsystem (RPS).

=== Checkout, Control and Monitor Subsystem ===
The Checkout, Control and Monitor Subsystem (CCMS) controls the actual processing and launch of the Space Shuttle. This subsystem consists of the staffed consoles in the firing room, as well as minicomputers, and data transmission and recording systems, which monitor the pre-launch performance of all electrical and mechanical systems on board the Shuttle vehicle. The various systems being monitored are managed from operator-controlled consoles, which are clustered together based on the type of systems. The LPS master console in the firing room links the CCMS with the other subsystems of the LPS.

=== Central Data Subsystem ===
The Central Data Subsystem (CDS) consists of a cluster of high-end minicomputers which store vital data such as vehicle test and performance data, test procedures, historical data, etc. There are two primary interfaces into the CDS. The first is a real-time interface with the CCMS. The second is a video simulation interface which allows testing of firing room systems without the need to have a vehicle present.

The CDS originally consisted of two mainframe computers. It was upgraded in 1999 to its current clustered state, and was renamed the Shuttle Data Center (SDC)

The CDS/SDC is located on the second floor of the Launch Control Center.

=== Record and Playback Subsystem ===
The Record and Playback Subsystem (RPS), as the name implies, records unprocessed data from various sources during testing and countdown. This can be played back at a later time for analysis. The RPS consists of tape recorders, telemetry equipment, and computers to perform analysis and data reduction.
