= Mission control center =

Facility that manages aerospace vehicle flights

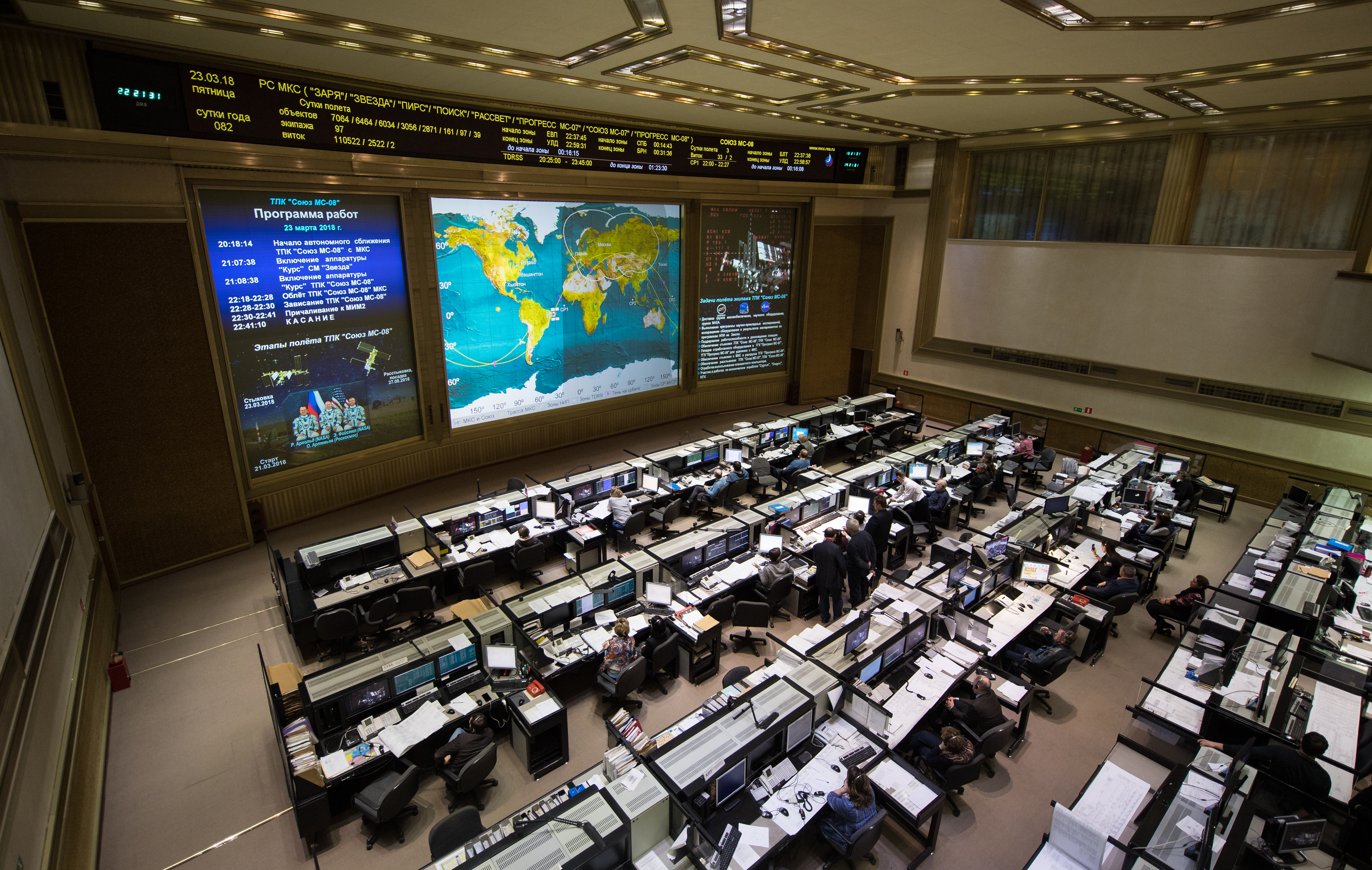
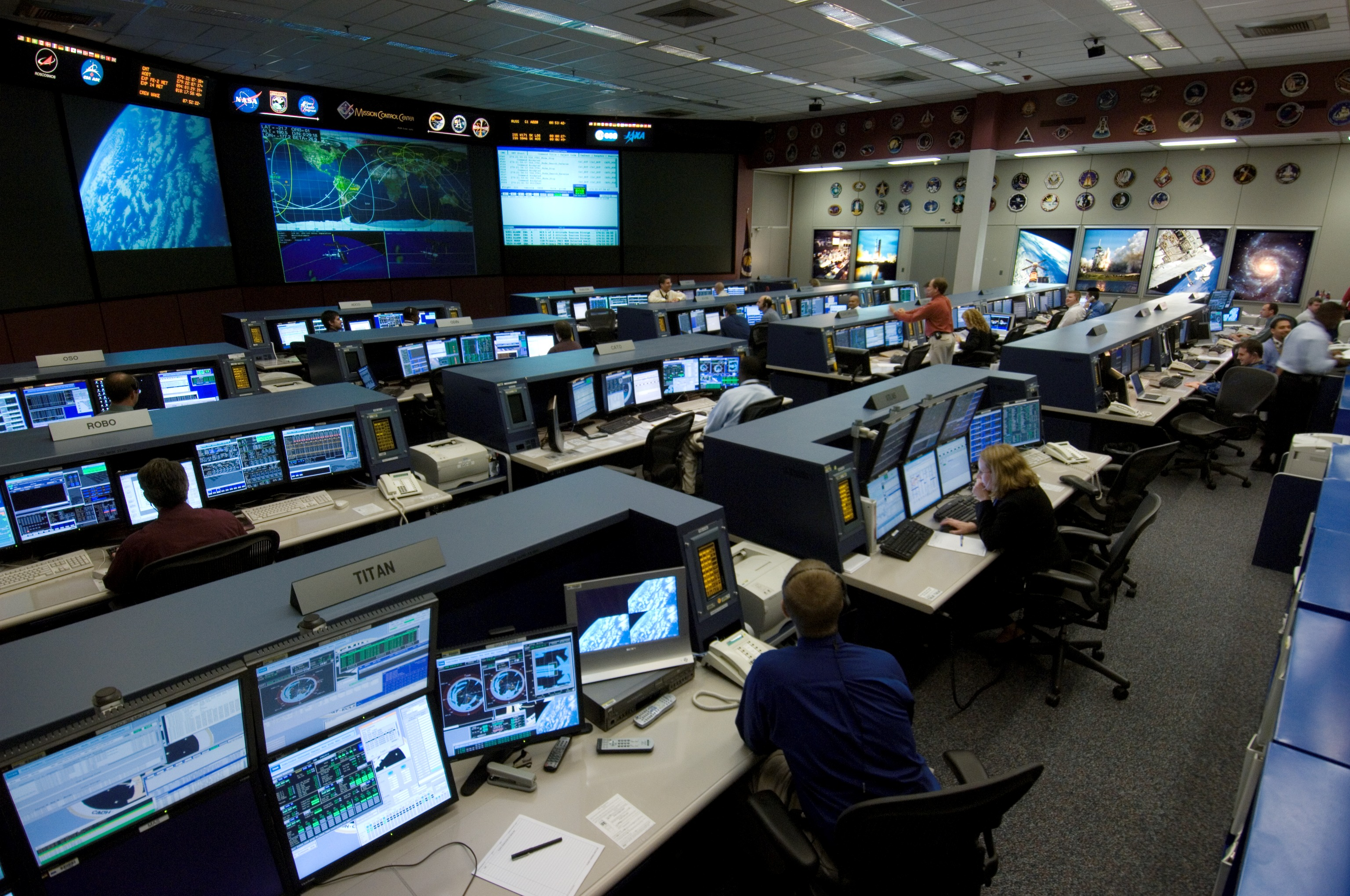
International Space Station control rooms in Russia and in the United States.

A mission control center (MCC, sometimes called a flight control center or operations center) is a facility that manages space flights, usually from the point of launch until landing or the end of the mission. It is part of the ground segment of spacecraft operations. A staff of flight controllers and other support personnel monitor all aspects of the mission using telemetry, and send commands to the vehicle using ground stations. Personnel supporting the mission from an MCC can include representatives of the attitude control system, power, propulsion, thermal, attitude dynamics, orbital operations and other subsystem disciplines. The training for these missions usually falls under the responsibility of the flight controllers, typically including extensive rehearsals in the MCC.

== Government-operated Mission Control Centers ==
America

- NASA Launch Control Center controls NASA launch missions prior to liftoff from facilities located at NASA's Kennedy Space Center on Merritt Island, Florida. Responsibility for the booster and spacecraft remains with the Launch Control Center until the booster has cleared the launch tower.
- Christopher C. Kraft Jr. Mission Control Center assumes responsibility for crewed missions after liftoff. The facility (abbreviated MCC-H, full name Christopher C. Kraft Jr. Mission Control Center) is located in Houston, Texas at the Lyndon B. Johnson Space Center. NASA's Mission Control Center in Houston also manages the U.S. portions of the International Space Station (ISS).
- Mercury Control Center was located on the Cape Canaveral Air Force Station and was used during Project Mercury. One of its still standing buildings now serves as a makeshift bunker for the media if a rocket explodes near the ground.
- Multi-Mission Operations Center at the Ames Research Center
- The Space Flight Operations Facility is operated by the Jet Propulsion Laboratory (JPL) in Pasadena, California and manages all of NASA's uncrewed spacecraft outside Earth's orbit and several research probes within along with the Deep Space Network.
- Space Telescope Operations Control Center (STOCC) is located at Goddard Space Flight Center in Greenbelt, Maryland and provides mission control for the Hubble Space Telescope.
- Payload Operations and Integration Center at the Marshall Spaceflight Center in Huntsville, Alabama where science activities aboard the International Space Station are monitored around the clock.
- The Multimission Operations Center at the Applied Physics Laboratory near Baltimore, Maryland controls spacecraft including the MESSENGER and New Horizons missions.
- NOAA operates its constellation of satellites from the Satellite Operations Control Center (SOCC) at Suitland, Maryland and Command and Data Acquisition (CDA) facilities at Wallops, Virginia and Fairbanks, Alaska. Satellites controlled include JPSS and GOES.
- The Canadian Space Agency Robotics Mission Control Centre in Longueuil, Quebec plans and conducts Canadarm and Dextre operations at the International Space Station.
- The Centro de Operações Espaciais (COPE) is operated by the Brazilian Armed Forces to support government satellites in orbit. Two Space Operations Centers (COPEs) are part of its structure: the main center (COPE-P) in Brasília and the secondary center (COPE-S) in Rio de Janeiro.

Asia

- Beijing Aerospace Command and Control Center is a command center for the Chinese space program which includes the Shenzhou missions. The building is inside a complex nicknamed Aerospace City. The city is located in a suburb northwest of Beijing.
- The Master Control Facility of the Indian Space Research Organisation is located at Satish Dhawan Space Centre, Sriharikota, India.
- JEM Control Center and the HTV Control Center at the Tsukuba Space Center (TKSC) in Tsukuba, Japan manages operations aboard JAXA's Kibo ISS research laboratory and the resupply flights of the H-II Transfer Vehicle. JAXAs satellite operations are also based here.

Europe

- European Space Operations Centre (ESOC) is responsible for ESA's satellites and space probes. It is located in Darmstadt, Germany.
- German Space Operations Center (GSOC) is responsible for DLR's satellites and other customers' missions. It is located in Oberpfaffenhofen near Munich, Germany.
- The Columbus Control Centre (Col-CC) at the German Aerospace Center (DLR) in Oberpfaffenhofen, Germany. It is the mission control center for the European Columbus research laboratory at the International Space Station.
- Europe's Galileo global navigation satellite system (GNSS) is operated by two Galileo Control Centres (GCC) situated in Oberpfaffenhofen, Germany and Fucino, Italy.
- The French National Centre for Space Studies (CNES) ATV Control Centre (ATV-CC) is located at the Toulouse Space Centre (CST) in Toulouse, France. It was the mission control center for the European Automated Transfer Vehicles, that regularly resupplied ISS. Currently it controls the civilian Surface Water and Ocean Topography mission and the military CERES (satellite) constellation.
- The Rover Operations Control Centre (ROCC) is located in Turin, Italy. It will be the mission control center for the ExoMars rover Rosalind Franklin.

Russia

- The Mission Control Center of the Russian Federal Space Agency (Russian: Центр управления полётами), also known by its acronym ЦУП ("TsUP") is located in Korolyov, near the RKK Energia plant. It contains an active control room for the ISS. It also houses a memorial control room for the Mir where the last few orbits of Mir before it burned up in the atmosphere are shown on the display screens.
- Titov Main Test and Space Systems Control Centre, mission control center in Krasnoznamensk, Russia.

== Privately-operated Mission Control Centers ==
- Axiom Space Mission Control Center (MCC-A) in Houston, Texas.
- Boeing Satellite Development Center (SDC) Mission Control Center in El Segundo, California, US. In charge of several military satellites.
- The Kongsberg Satellite Services (KSAT) space operations center in Tromsø, Norway performs command and control for 13 satellites.
- Lockheed Martin A2100 Space Operations Center (ASOC) in Newtown, Pennsylvania, US. In charge of several military satellites.
- Parsons Corporation operates the Parsons Space Operations Center (PSOC) in Colorado Springs, Colorado to support command and control for the NOAA POES and DARPA Blackjack satellite programs.
- Satellite operator SES controls its fleet of more than 50 satellites from operations centers in both Princeton, New Jersey and Luxembourg.
- Space Systems/Loral Mission Control Center in Palo Alto, California, US.
- SpaceX Mission Control Center (MCC-X) in Hawthorne, California is the primary launch control facility for the company's Falcon rockets.

== See also ==
- Control room
- Ground segment
- Launch status check
