= Rocco Petrone =

American NASA official (1926–2006)

Rocco A. Petrone
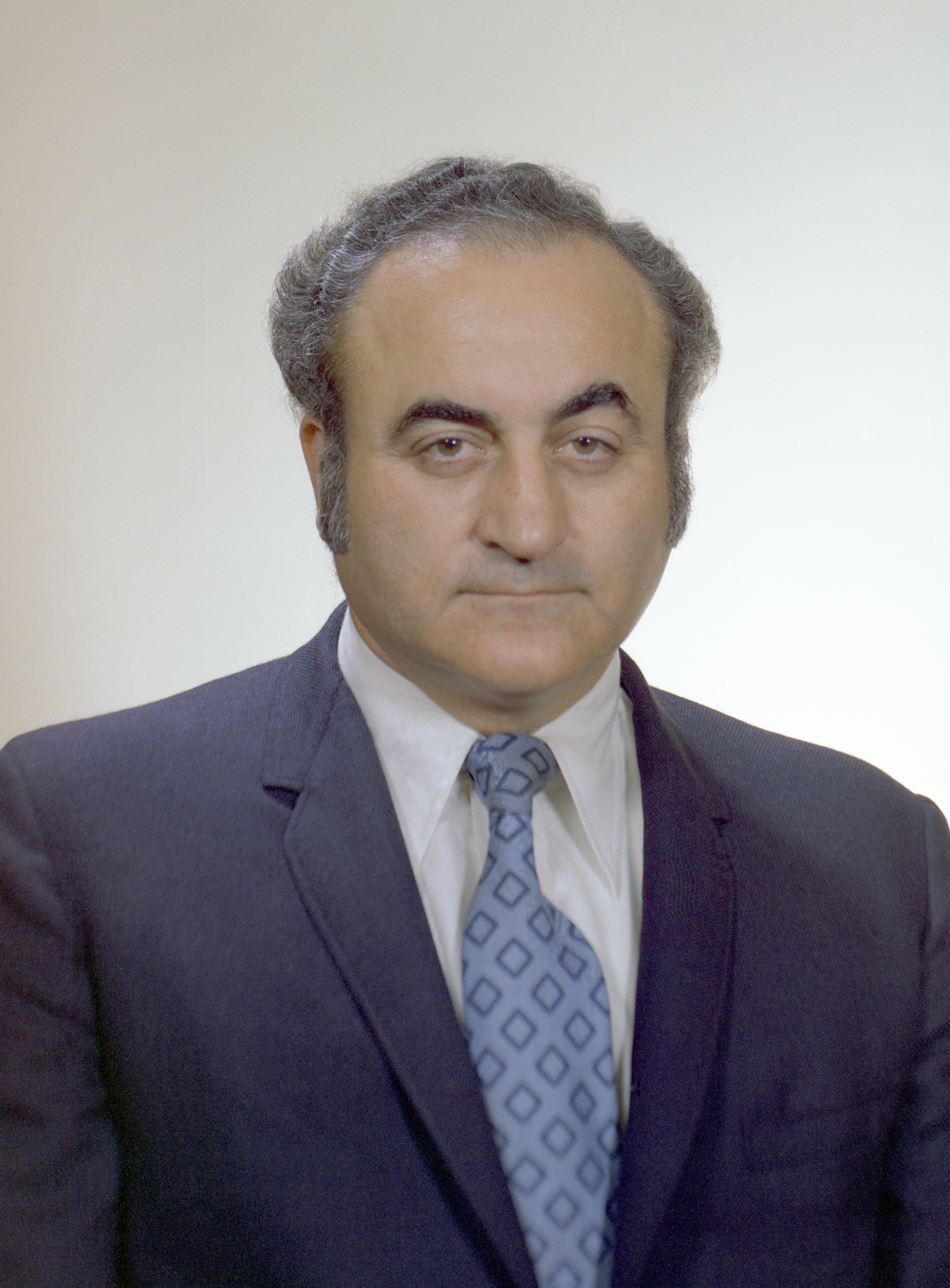
- Official NASA portrait
- Born: Rocco Anthony Petrone; March 31, 1926; Amsterdam, New York, U.S.
- Died: August 24, 2006 (aged 80); Palos Verdes Estates, California, U.S.
- Education: United States Military Academy, B.S. 1946; Massachusetts Institute of Technology, master's degree in mechanical engineering, 1951
- Occupation(s): Director of the Marshall Space Flight Center
- Spouse: Ruth Holley Petrone
- Children: 4

Rocco Anthony Petrone (March 31, 1926 – August 24, 2006) was an American mechanical engineer, U.S. Army officer and NASA official. He served as director of launch operations at NASA's Kennedy Space Center (KSC) from 1966 to 1969, as Apollo program director at NASA Headquarters from 1969 to 1973, as third director of NASA's Marshall Space Flight Center from 1973 to 1974, and as NASA Associate Administrator from 1974 until his retirement from NASA in 1975.

== Early life ==
The son of Italian immigrants, Anthony and Theresa (née DeLuca) Petrone, emigrated from Sasso di Castalda, Petrone was raised Roman Catholic and attended the United States Military Academy at West Point. There he played defensive tackle for the 1945 national football championship winning team. Graduating with a Bachelor of Science degree in 1946, he served in West Germany from 1947 to 1950.

He also earned a master's degree in mechanical engineering from the Massachusetts Institute of Technology in 1951, and later received an honorary doctorate from Rollins College. During two decades with the U.S. Army, Petrone took part in developing the Redstone rocket, the first U.S. ballistic missile and the vehicle used to launch America's first astronauts, Alan Shepard and Gus Grissom on their suborbital missions. He retired from the U.S. Army in 1966 with the rank of lieutenant colonel.

== NASA career ==
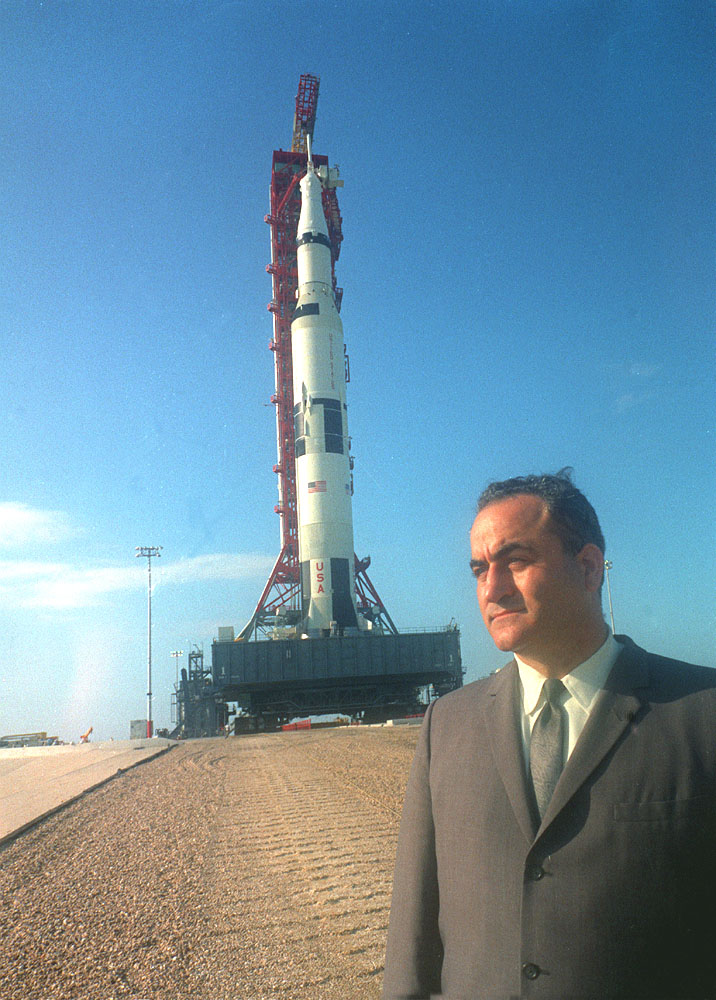
Petrone at the Apollo 11 rollout at LC-39 on May 20, 1969

In 1960, Petrone was assigned to NASA. There, Petrone presided over the development of Saturn V launch operations, dubbing the period of preparation leading up to each launch "five-month marathons". He oversaw construction of all the launch elements of the Apollo program at Kennedy Space Center, including Launch Complex 39, the Vehicle Assembly Building, and the Crawler-Transporter, all of which were later modified for Space Shuttle operations. After his retirement from the Army in 1966 he continued to work for NASA as a civilian, being promoted to director of launch operations at KSC in July 1966. In September 1969, shortly after the Apollo 11 mission, he was appointed director of the entire Apollo program at NASA Headquarters. In 1972, Petrone was assigned additional responsibilities as program director of the NASA portion of the joint United States / Soviet Union Apollo-Soyuz Test Project.

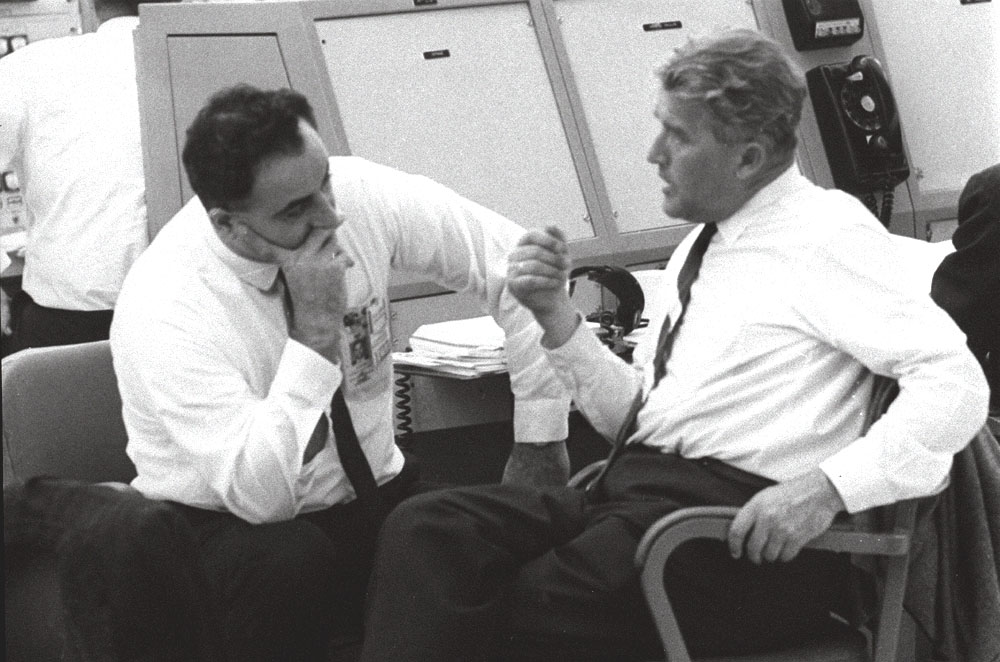
Petrone (l) and Wernher von Braun talk during preparations for the 1965 A-104 (SA-8) Saturn 1 launch at LC-37

From 1973 to 1974, Petrone served as the first non-German administrator of the Marshall Space Flight Center, after Wernher von Braun and Eberhard Rees. At the time NASA was undergoing budget cutbacks, and his tenure was marked with many reassignments or firings.

In 1974, Petrone left the Marshall Center to accept an appointment at NASA headquarters, assuming the post of NASA Associate Administrator, the third-highest-ranking official within the agency.

== After NASA ==
In 1975, Petrone retired from NASA and became the president and CEO of the National Center for Resource Recovery, a collaborative industry and labor initiative aimed at developing and promoting methods to recover materials and energy from solid waste.

In the 1980s, Petrone held senior posts at Rockwell International, the manufacturer of the Space Shuttle Orbiter. He eventually rose to become head of Rockwell's space transportation division.

On the morning that the Space Shuttle Challenger was due to launch on STS-51-L, Petrone and several of his colleagues were alarmed at the massive amount of ice that had built up overnight on the Orbiter due to unseasonably cold temperatures. Petrone feared that the ice could seriously damage the shuttle's thermal protection system when it struck the tiles during launch. He told his managers at Cape Canaveral that Rockwell could not support launching because it viewed the amount of ice on the orbiter as a launch constraint. This was not the cause, however, of the launch failure that killed seven astronauts.

Petrone died on August 24, 2006, from complications related to diabetes in Palos Verdes Estates, California, aged 80. In February 2022, NASA renamed the Launch Control Center in Florida to the "Rocco A. Petrone Launch Control Center" in his honor.

== Character ==
Petrone was described as demanding by his NASA colleagues. Humboldt C. Mandell, Jr. said that once:

NASA was grilling the contractor people on some program delays. Rocco ... kept probing this one young contractor engineer, who quickly reached the limit of his knowledge. Instead of admitting it, he tried to bluff. Rocco took him physically off of the podium. He ... told the boss that the young man was to be removed from the program.

In a similar vein, Noel Hinners related the following:

Rocco could be a tyrant in the formal meetings. On one occasion he demanded I tell him if it was a Phillips-head or a straight-head screw in [a box]. I annoyingly responded, 'How the hell would I know?' Years later I deduced that this was Rocco's technique for getting you to the point where you'd best say, 'I don't know,' rather than try to fake it and was part of his 'pay attention to detail' mentality.

== Bibliography ==
- Rocco A. Petrone, Il sistema di lancio delle missioni Apollo, in Scienza & tecnica 70. Annuario della EST. Enciclopedia della scienza e della tecnica, Milan, Mondadori, 1970, p. 71-84
