= Christopher C. Kraft Jr. Mission Control Center =

United States historic place in Houston, Texas

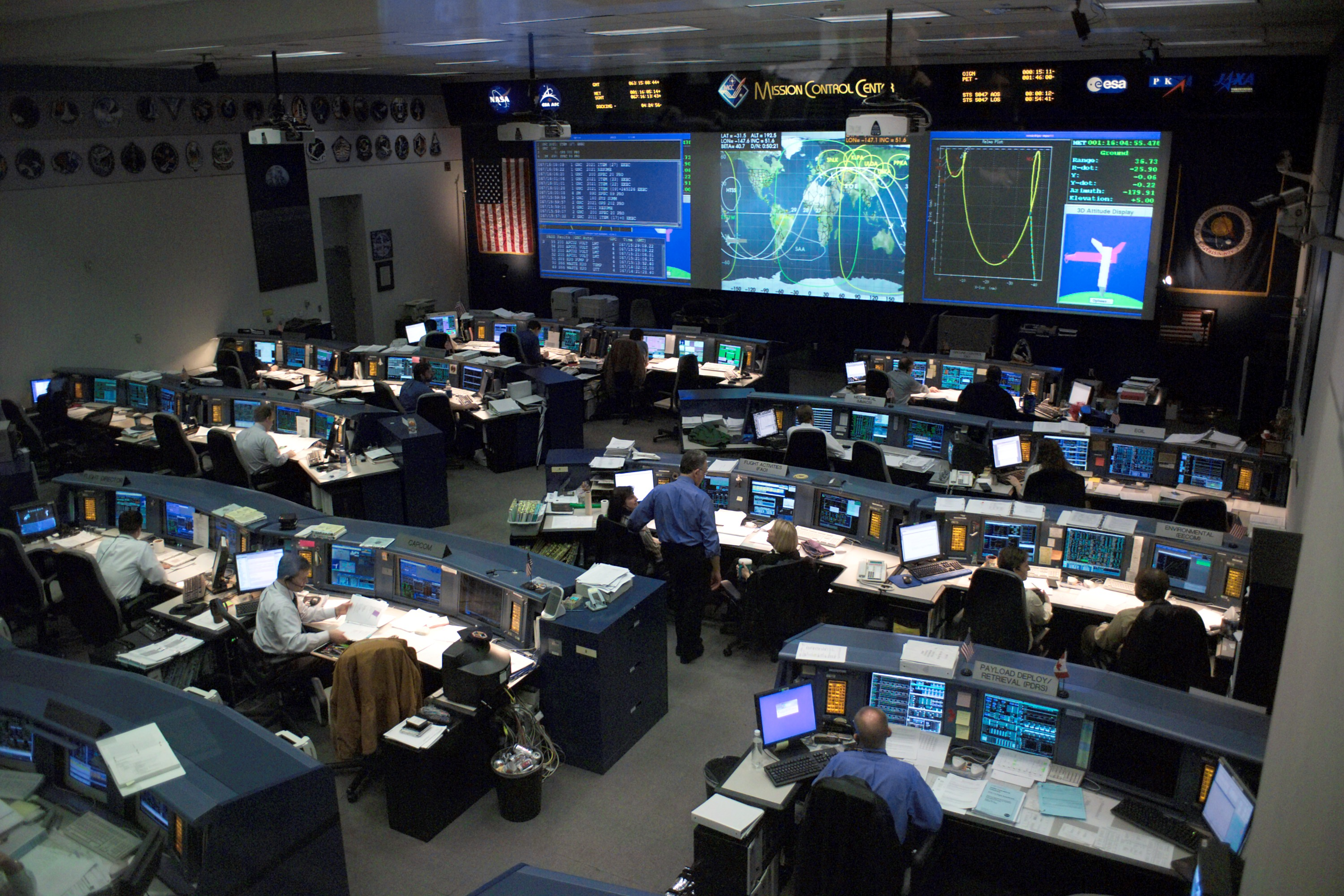
White Flight Control Room prior to STS-114 in 2005

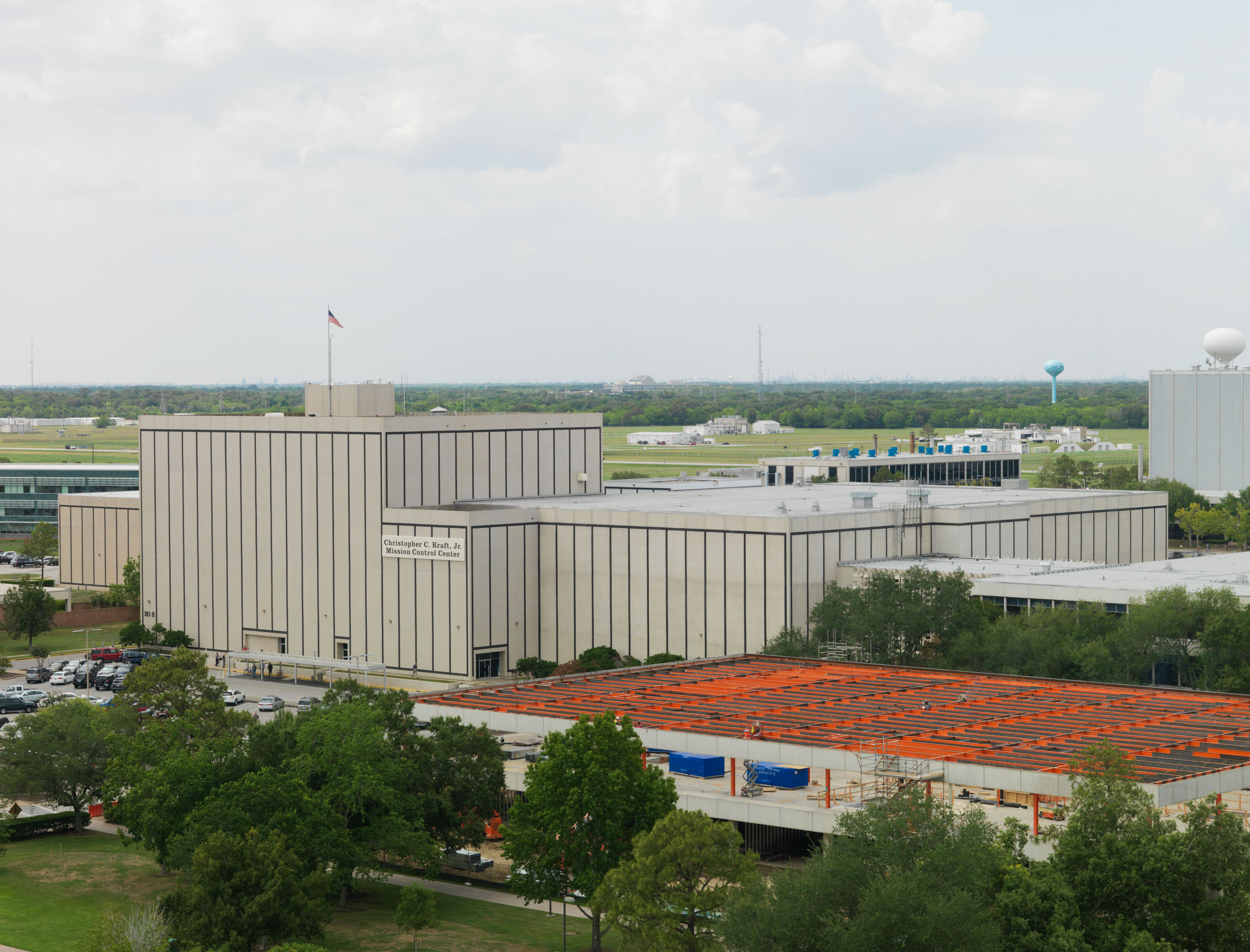
Exterior of the Mission Control building

Emblem for NASA's Flight Operations Directorate (FOD)

NASA's Christopher C. Kraft Jr. Mission Control Center (MCC-H, initially called Integrated Mission Control Center, or IMCC), also known by its radio callsign, Houston, is the facility at the Lyndon B. Johnson Space Center in Houston, Texas, that manages flight control for the United States human space program, currently involving astronauts aboard the International Space Station (ISS) and the Artemis missions to the moon. The center is in Building 30 at the Johnson Space Center and is named after Christopher C. Kraft Jr., a NASA engineer and manager who was instrumental in establishing the agency's Mission Control operation, and was the first Flight Director.

The MCC currently houses one operational control room in Building 30 from which flight controllers command, monitor, and plan operations for the ISS. This room has many computer and data-processing resources to monitor, command and communicate with the station. The ISS control room operates continuously. A second control room in the same building, which formerly hosted the Shuttle flight control team, can be set up for ISS operations should the need arise (e.g., during repairs or hardware upgrades in the main room), and also hosts training simulations.

== Cape Canaveral (1960–1965) ==
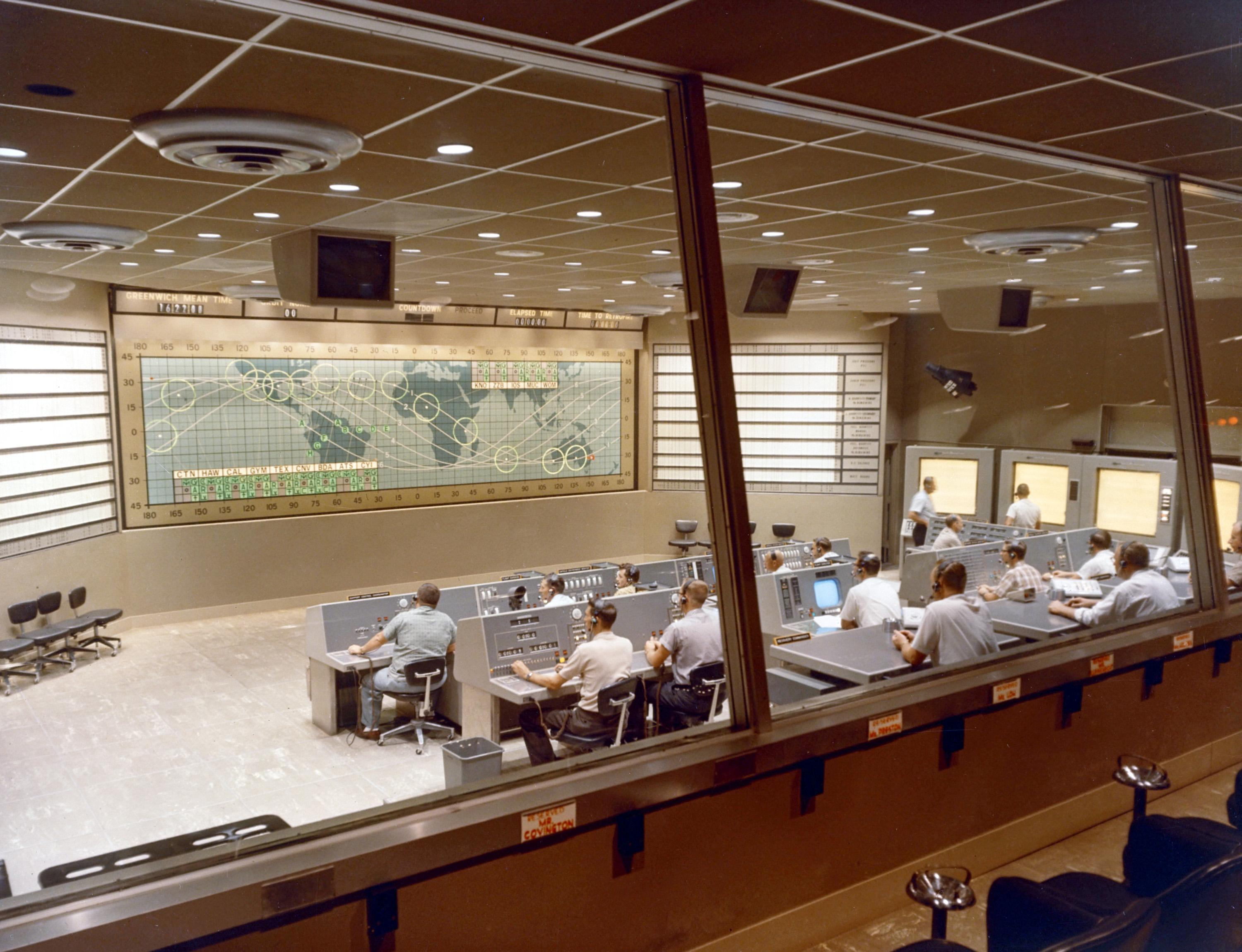
Mercury Control at Cape Canaveral during a simulation of Mercury-Atlas 8 in 1962

All Mercury–Redstone, Mercury-Atlas, the uncrewed Gemini 1 and Gemini 2, and crewed Gemini 3 missions were controlled by the Mission Control Center (called the Mercury Control Center through 1963) at Cape Canaveral Missile Test Annex, Florida. This facility was in the Engineering Support Building at the east end of Mission Control Road, about 0.5 mile (0.8 km) east of Phillips Parkway. Mercury and Gemini launches were conducted from separate blockhouses at the Cape.

The building, which was on the National Register of Historic Places, was demolished in May 2010 due to concerns about asbestos and the estimated $5 million cost of repairs after 40 years of exposure to salt air. Formerly a stop on the Kennedy Space Center Visitor Complex tours, in the late 1990s, the control room consoles were removed, refurbished, and relocated to a re-creation of the room in the Debus Center at the KSC Visitor Complex.

== Houston (1965–present) ==
=== Gemini and Apollo (1965–1975) ===
- Apollo Mission Control Center
- U.S. National Register of Historic Places
- U.S. National Historic Landmark
- Location within Texas Location within the United States
- Location: Houston, Texas
- Coordinates: 29°33′29″N 95°5′18″W
- Built: 1965
- Architect: Charles Luckman
- Architectural style: International
- NRHP reference No.: 85002815

Significant dates
- Added to NRHP: October 3, 1985
- Designated NHL: October 3, 1985

Located in Building 30 at the Johnson Space Center (known as the Manned Spacecraft Center until 1973), the Houston MCC was first used in June 1965 for Gemini 4. It housed two primary rooms known as Mission Operation Control Rooms (MOCR, pronounced "moh-ker"). These two rooms controlled all Gemini, Apollo, Skylab, and Space Shuttle flights up to 1996. Each consisted of a four-tier auditorium, dominated by a large map screen, which, with the exception of Apollo lunar flights, had a Mercator projection of the Earth, with locations of tracking stations, and a three-orbit "sine wave" track of the spacecraft in flight. Each MOCR tier was specialized, staffed by various controllers responsible for a specific spacecraft system.

MOCR 1, housed on the second floor of Building 30, was used for Apollo 5, Apollo 7, the Skylab and the Apollo-Soyuz Test Project (Saturn IB) missions.

==== Mission Operations Control Room 2 ====
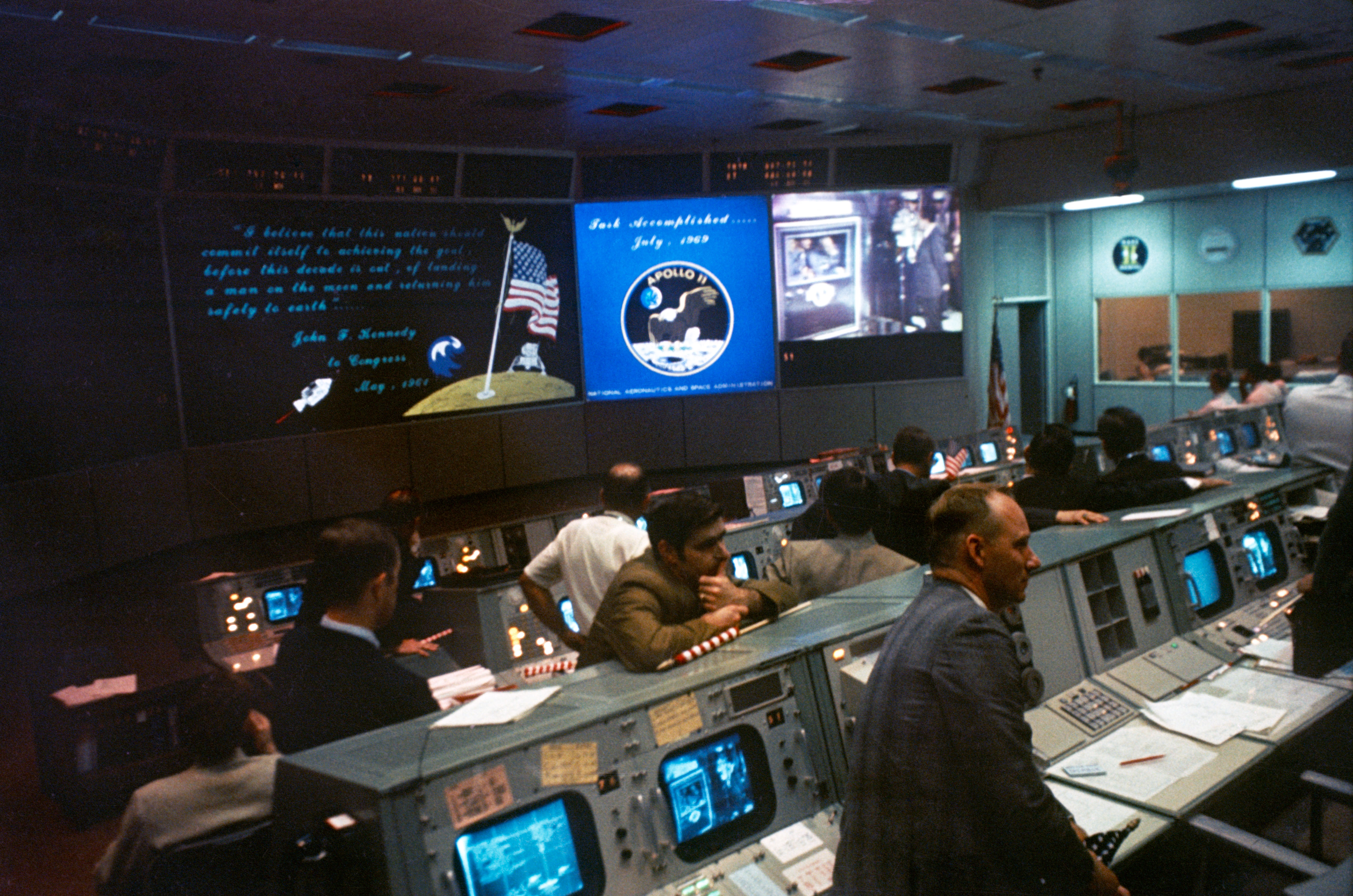
MOCR 2 at the conclusion of Apollo 11 in 1969

MOCR 2 was used for all other Gemini and Apollo (Saturn V) flights (except Gemini 3) and was located on the third floor. As the flight control room for Apollo 11, the first crewed Moon landing, MOCR 2 was designated a National Historic Landmark in 1985. It was last used in 1992 as the flight control room for STS-53 and was subsequently converted back almost entirely to its Apollo-era configuration and preserved for historical purposes. Together with several support wings, it is now listed in the National Register of Historic Places as the "Apollo Mission Control Center". In January 2018, the first set of consoles in MOCR 2 were removed and sent to the Kansas Cosmosphere for archival cleaning, refurbishment, and restoration to Apollo-era configuration, for eventual display back in the control room. On July 1, 2019, the newly restored Apollo-era Mission Control was reopened to the public, after a two-year long effort to restore the room to its configuration as seen during the Apollo Moon landings. Period-appropriate accents were acquired, from cigarette packs and ashtrays to wallpaper and carpeting. The room is accessible via the tram tour at the nearby Space Center Houston visitors' center, but only from behind the glass in the restored Visitor's Gallery viewing room.

In July 2010, air to ground voice recordings and film footage shot in Mission Control during the Apollo 11 powered descent and landing was re-synchronized and released for the first time. This audio was used in creating an audio-visual presentation for the 2019 Mission Control update.

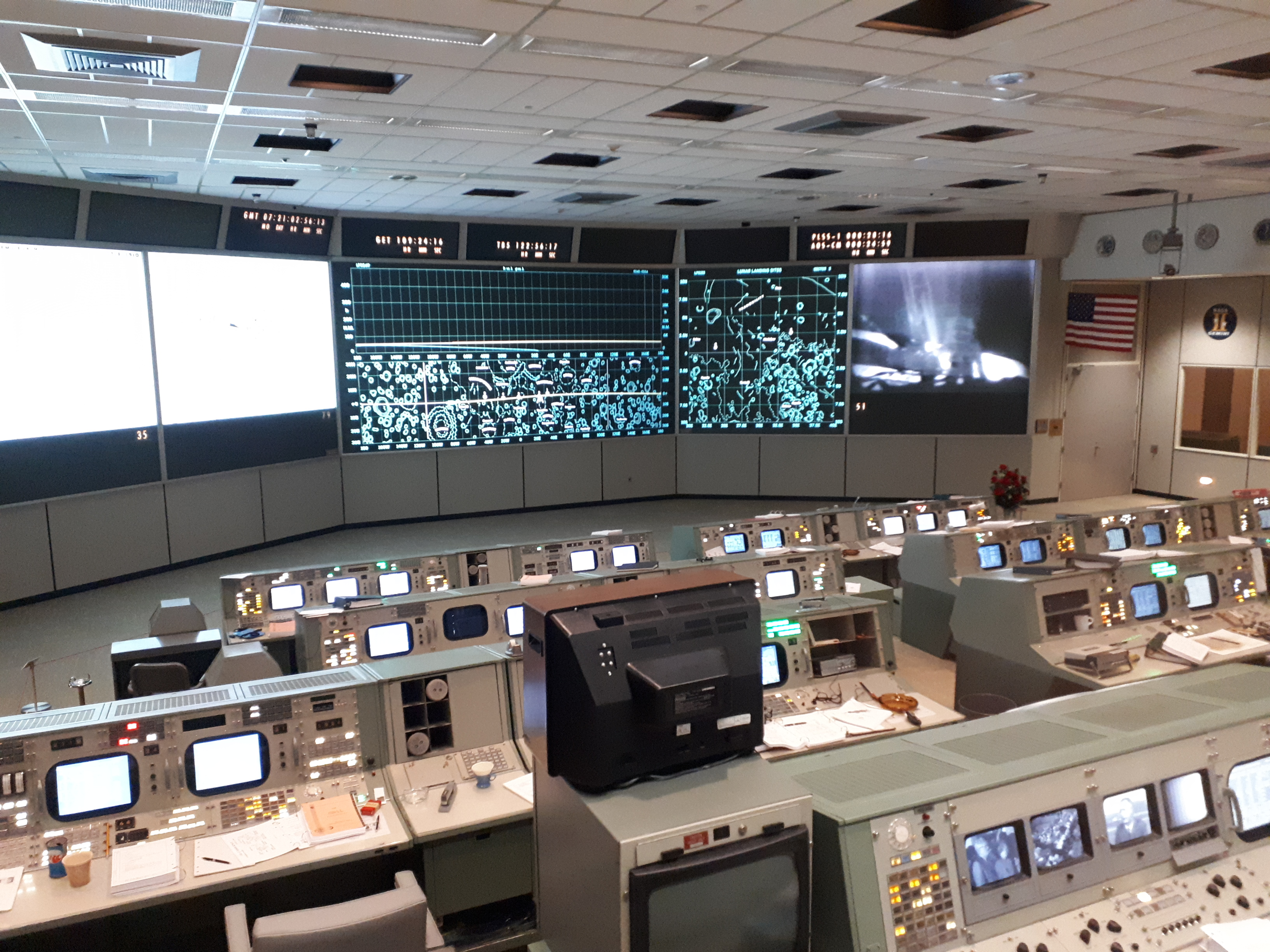
Mission Operations Control Room 2 in 2019, after restoration

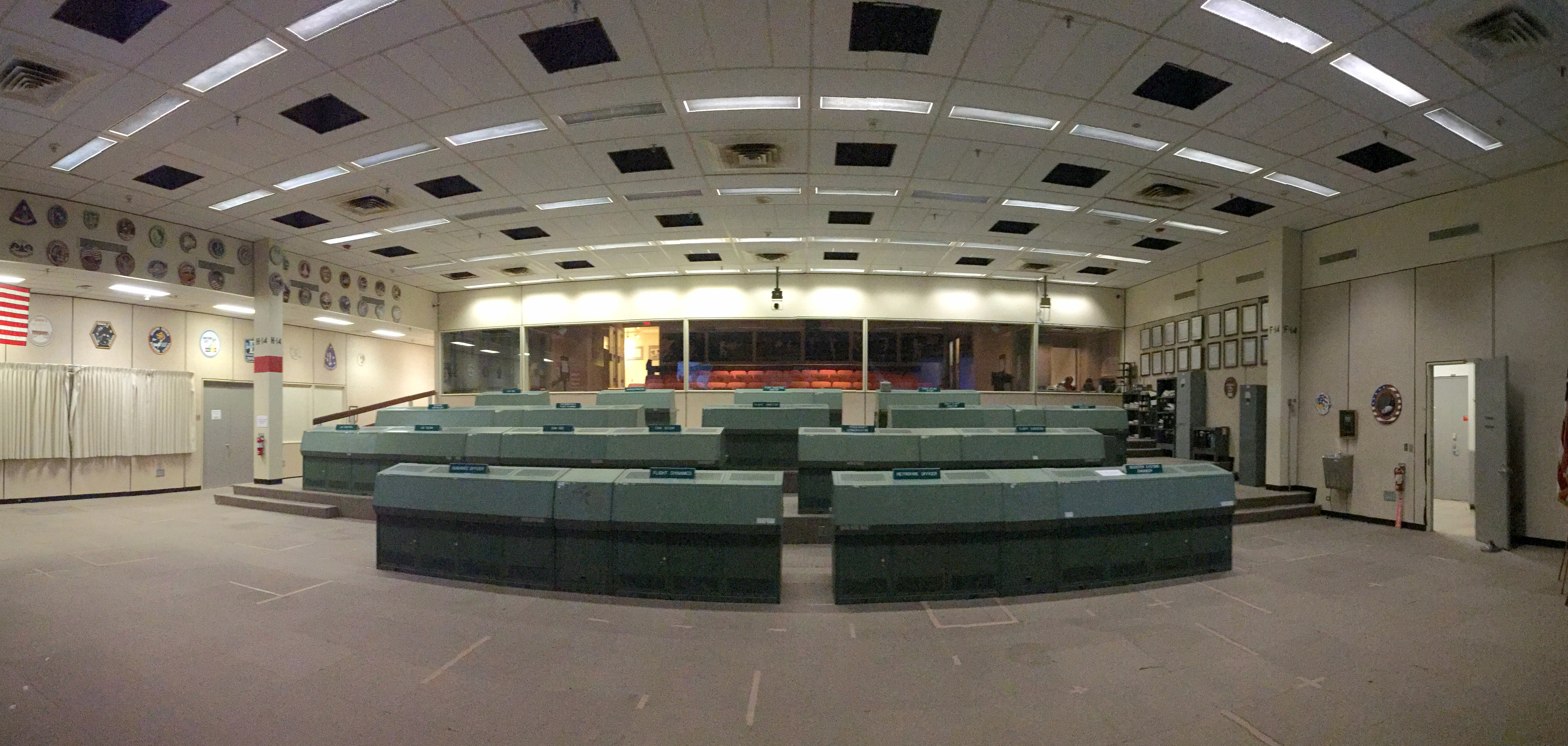
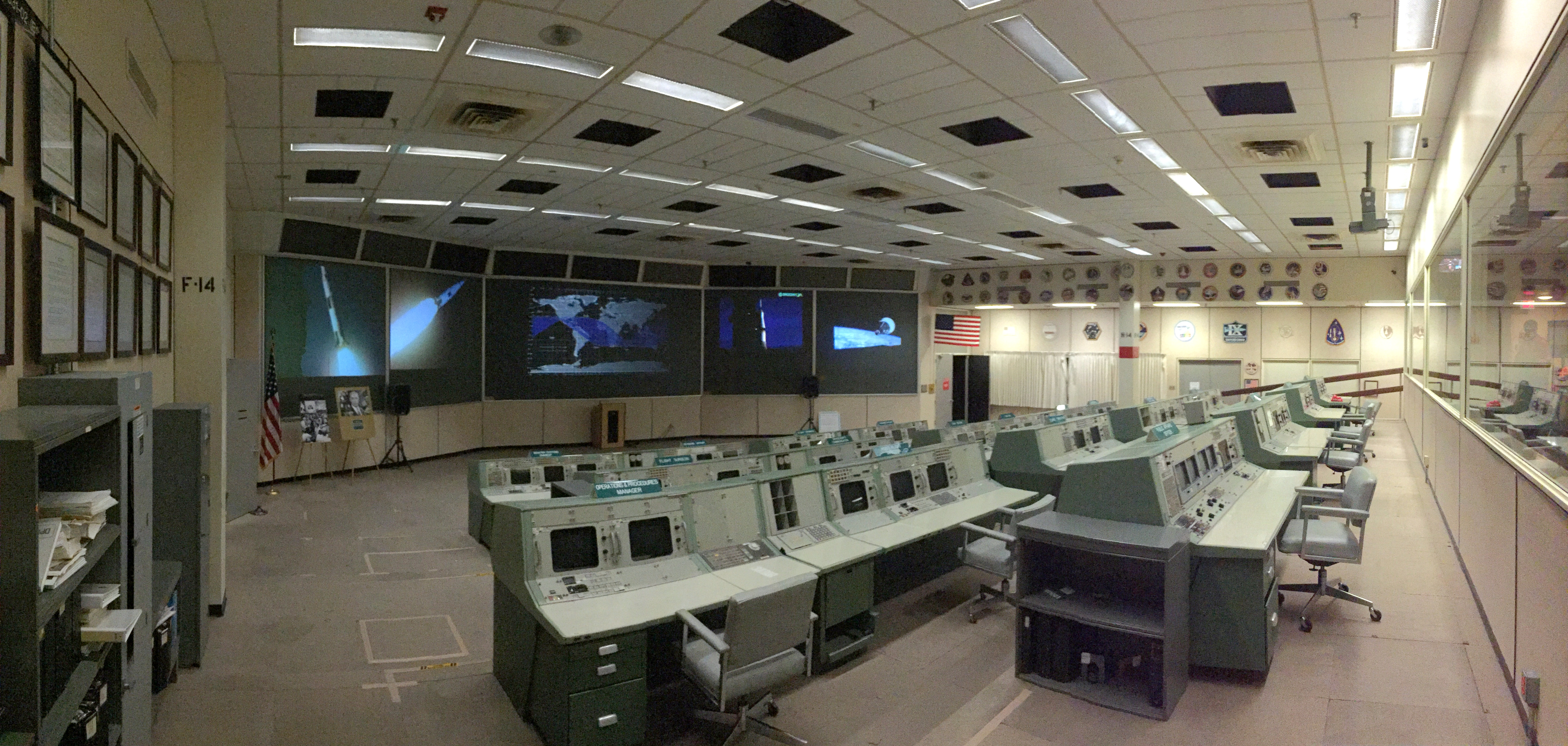
Mission Operation Control Room 2, now a historic landmark (as seen prior to the 2019 restoration)

=== Space Shuttle (1981–2011) ===
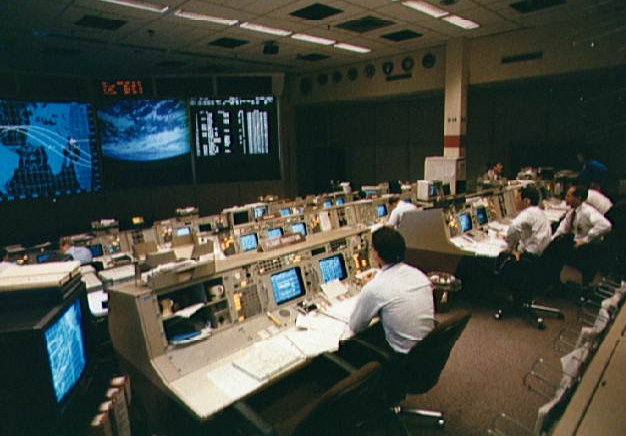
Flight Control Room 1 during STS-30 in 1989

When the Space Shuttle program began, the MOCRs were re-designated flight control rooms (FCR, pronounced "ficker"); and FCR 1 (formerly MOCR 1) became the first shuttle control room. FCR 2 was used mostly for classified Department of Defense shuttle flights, then was remodeled to its Apollo-era configuration. From the moment a Space Shuttle cleared its launch tower in Florida until it landed on Earth, it was in the hands of Mission Control. When a shuttle mission was underway, its control room was staffed around the clock, usually in three shifts.

In 1992, JSC began building an extension to Building 30. The new five-story section (30 South) went operational in 1998 and houses two flight control rooms, designated White and Blue. The White FCR was used in tandem with FCR 2 for seven Space Shuttle missions, STS-70 through STS-76, and handled all following shuttle flights through the end of the program. When not in use for the shuttle program, the White FCR was reconfigured as a backup for the ISS FCR from time to time as needed (such as during periods of construction or upgrades in the ISS FCR).

=== International Space Station (1998–present) ===
The newer section of Building 30 also houses the International Space Station Flight Control Room. The first ISS control room, originally named the Special Vehicles Operations Room (SVO), then the Blue FCR, was operational around the clock to support the ISS until the fall of 2006.

FCR 1, meanwhile, had its original consoles and tiered decking removed after STS-71, and was first converted to a "Life Sciences Center" for ISS payload control operations. After substantial remodelling, mainly with new technologies not available in 1998, ISS flight control moved into the totally revamped FCR 1 in October 2006, due to the growth of the ISS and the international cooperation required among national control centers around the world.

=== Other facilities ===
Other MCC facilities include the Training Flight Control Room, sometimes referred to as the Red FCR, a training area for flight controllers; a Life Sciences Control Room used to oversee various experiments; the Simulation Control Area (SCA), primarily used during shuttle astronaut and flight control training; and an Exploration Planning Operations Center, used to test new concepts for operations beyond low-Earth orbit. Additionally, there are multi-purpose support rooms (MPSRs) which are staffed by backup flight controllers, who analyze data and run simulations as well as provide information and advice for the flight controllers.

Building 30 was named for Kraft on April 14, 2011.

=== MCC-21 ===
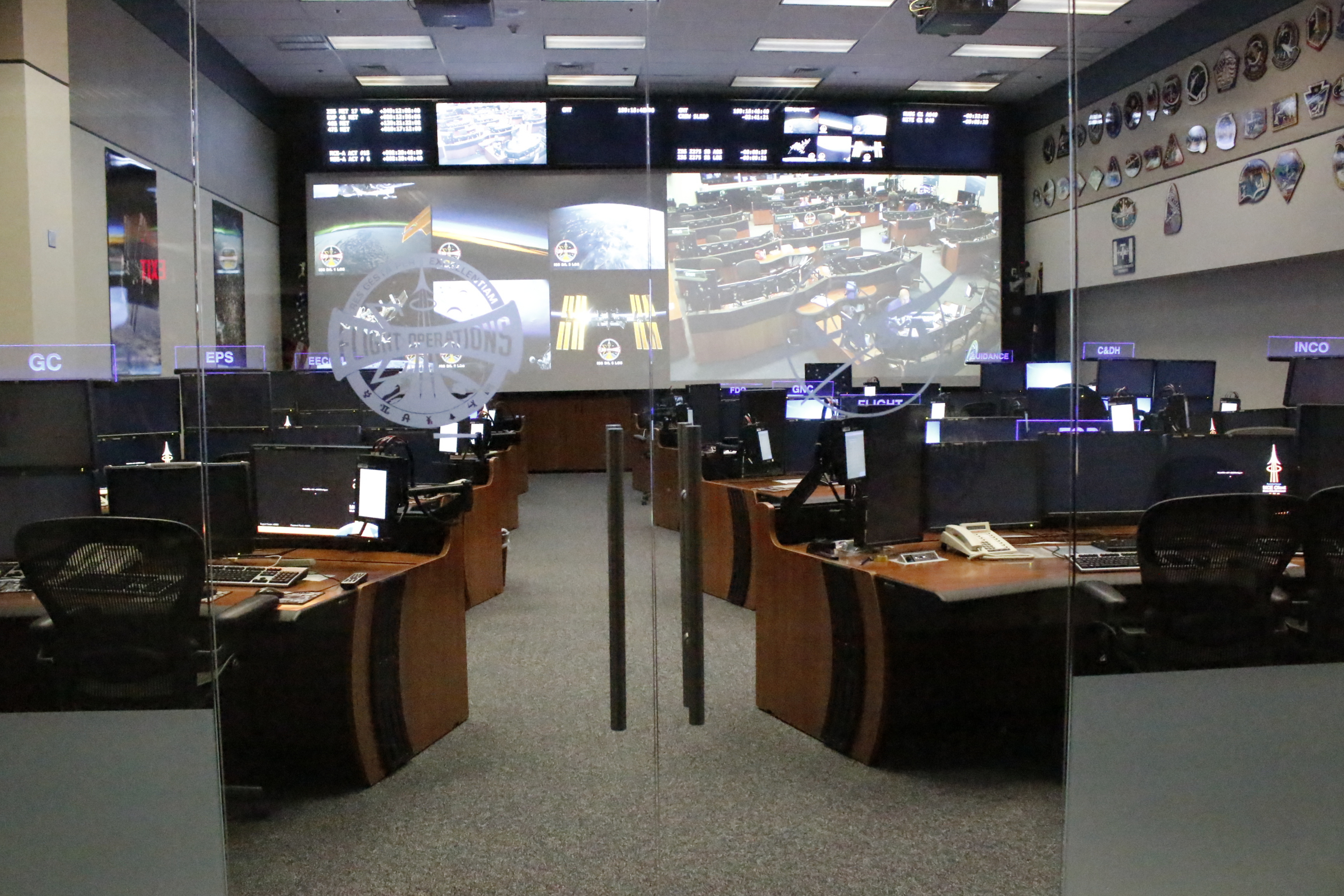
Blue Flight Control Room

From 2012 to 2014, the rooms used during the Shuttle program underwent upgrades in preparation for future human space flight activities. The ISS FCR 1, the White FCR, the Blue FCR, the SCA, and the MPSRs all had their consoles removed and replaced with modern hardware, in part to support the new operational concept of commercial companies having a presence in Mission Control. This project is known as Mission Control Center for the 21st Century, or MCC-21. The White FCR was officially completed and unveiled in April 2014. The modernized White FCR is used for flight controller training and occasionally for nominal ISS operations when FCR 1 is temporarily removed from service for repairs or upgrades.

=== Commercial Crew ===
In 2019, the first of the Commercial Crew vehicles to be controlled from Houston was launched: the Boeing CST-100 Starliner. The SpaceX Dragon 2 demo flight launched earlier in the year, but SpaceX Mission Control is at their headquarters in Hawthorne, CA. The Boeing Starliner missions use a number of control centers across the United States, several in Houston in the Mission Control building:

- Atlas V launch vehicle operations are controlled from the United Launch Alliance's Advanced Spaceflight Operations Center (formerly the Atlas Spaceflight Operations Center) (ASOC) at Cape Canaveral Space Force Station with support from a team in the Vehicle Ascent and Launch Operations Room (VALOR) at the company's headquarters in Denver, Colorado.
- The Boeing Mission Control Center (BMCC) is at the Kennedy Space Center looking after Starliner during ascent, orbit, and entry.
- Mission Control Center for the CST-100 is known as MCC-CST and operates out of the White FCR and Ops Suite 1 just outside the room.
- The Guidance, Navigation and Control (GNC) and flight software team reside in the Blue FCR down the hall from Mission Control Center-CST.

== Console positions ==
=== Mercury Control Center (1960–1963) ===
During the early years at Cape Canaveral, the original MCC consisted only of three rows, as the Mercury capsule was simple in design and construction, with missions lasting no more than 35 hours.

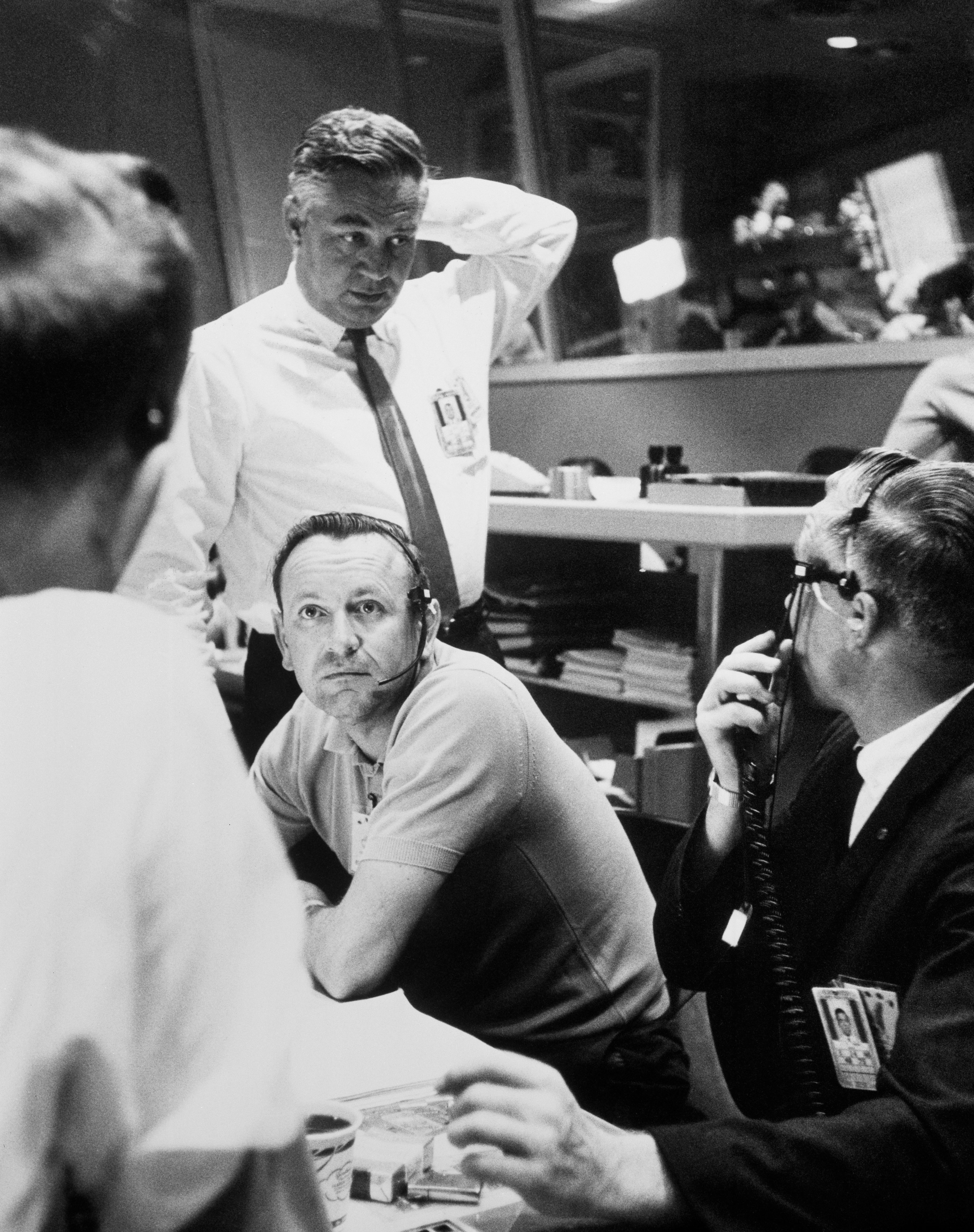
Walt Williams (standing) and Chris Kraft in Mercury Control during the 1963 Mercury-Atlas 9 mission

The first row consisted of several controllers, the Booster Systems Engineer (BOOSTER), Flight Surgeon (SURGEON), capsule communicator (CAPCOM), Retrofire Officer (RETRO), Flight Dynamics Officer (FIDO), and Guidance Officer (GUIDO).

The BOOSTER controller, depending upon the type of rocket being used, was either an engineer from the Marshall Space Flight Center (for Mercury-Redstone flights) or an Air Force engineer (for Mercury-Atlas and later Gemini-Titan flights) assigned for that mission. The BOOSTER controller's job would last no more than six hours total and he would vacate his console after the booster was jettisoned.

The SURGEON controller, consisting of a flight surgeon (either a military or civilian physician), monitored the astronaut's vital signs during the flight, and if a medical need arose, could recommend treatment. They could also talk directly to the astronaut crew if there was a medical need that the astronauts needed to discuss.

The CAPCOM controller, filled by an astronaut, maintained nominal air-to-ground communications between the MCC and the orbiting spacecraft; the exception being the SURGEON or Flight Director, and only in an emergency.

The RETRO, FIDO, and GUIDO controllers monitored spacecraft trajectory and handled course changes.

The second row also consisted of several controllers, the ENVIRONMENTAL, PROCEDURES, FLIGHT, SYSTEMS, and NETWORK. The ENVIRONMENTAL controller, later called EECOM, oversaw the consumption of spacecraft oxygen and monitored pressurization, while the SYSTEMS controller, later called EGIL, monitored all other spacecraft systems, including electrical consumption. The PROCEDURES controller, first held by Gene Kranz, handled the writing of all mission milestones, "GO/NO GO" decisions, and synchronized the MCC with the launch countdowns and the Eastern Test Range. The PROCEDURES controller also handled communications, via teletype, between the MCC and the worldwide network of tracking stations and ships.

The flight director, known as FLIGHT, was ultimate supervisor of the Mission Control Center, and gave the final orbit entrance/exit, and, in emergencies, mission abort decisions. During Mercury missions, this position was held by Christopher Kraft, with John Hodge, an Englishman who came to NASA after the cancellation of the Canadian Avro Arrow project, joining the flight director ranks for the 22-orbit Mercury 9, requiring Kraft to divide Mission Control into two shifts. The flight director's console was also the only position in the Cape MCC to have a television monitor, allowing him to see the rocket lift off from the pad. The NETWORK controller, an Air Force officer, served as the "switchboard" between the MCC, the Goddard Space Flight Center in Greenbelt, Maryland (as on-site real-time computing did not exist), and the worldwide tracking station and ship network.

The back row, consisting primarily of NASA and Department of Defense (DOD) management, was the location of the operations director (held by Walt Williams), a general or flag officer who could coordinate with the DOD on all search-and-rescue missions, and the PAO ("Shorty" Powers during Mercury), who provided minute-by-minute mission commentary for the news media and public.

In addition to the controllers in the Cape MCC, each of the crewed tracking stations and the Rose Knot Victor and Coastal Sentry Quebec tracking ships, had three controllers, a CAPCOM, SURGEON, and an engineer. Unlike the Cape CAPCOM, which was always staffed by an astronaut, the tracking station/tracking ship CAPCOMs were either a NASA engineer, or an astronaut, with the latter located at stations deemed "critical" by the flight director and operations director.

=== MOCR (1965–1998) ===
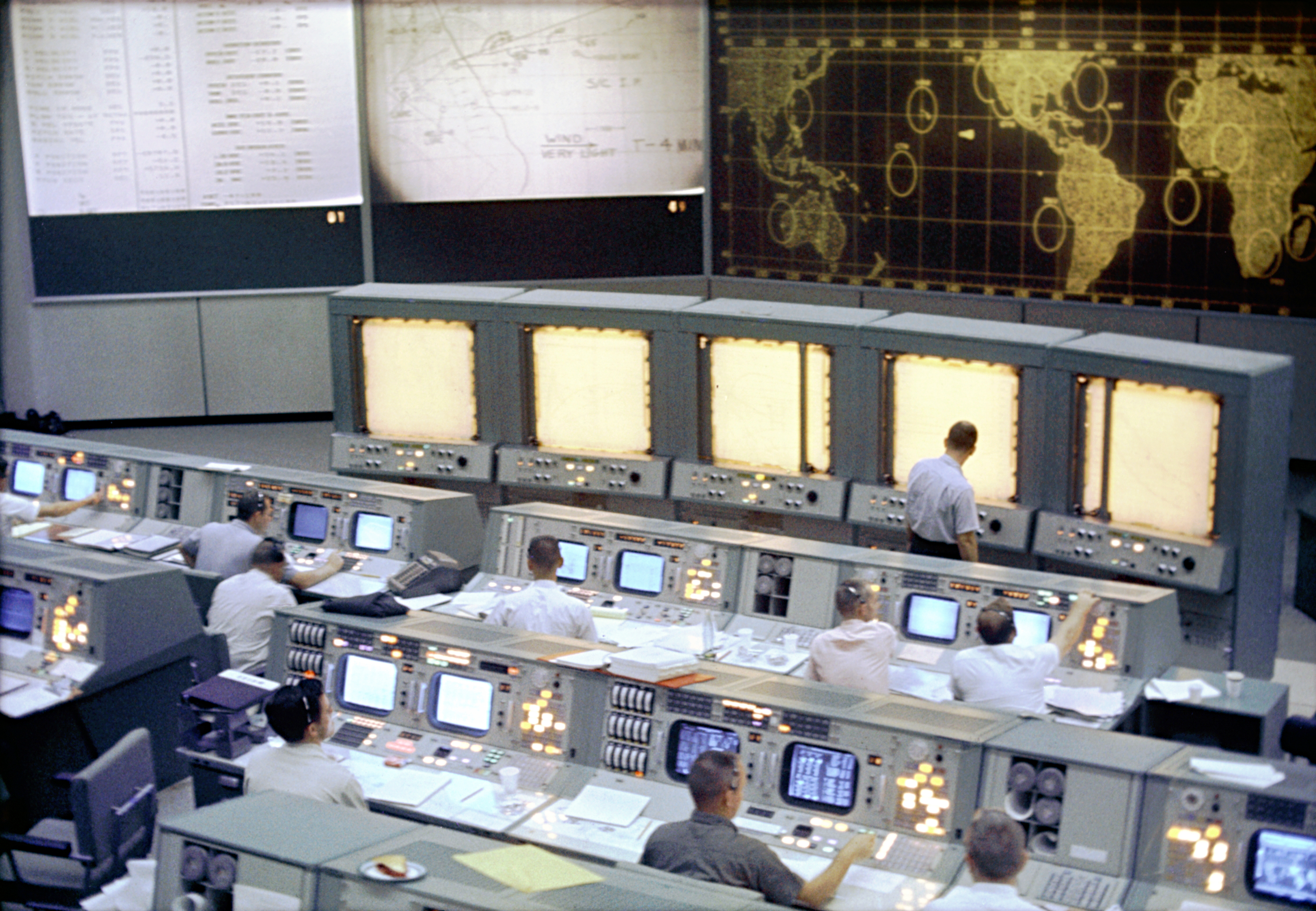
MOCR 2 during Gemini 5 in 1965

After the move from the Cape MCC to the Houston MCC in 1965, the new MOCRs, which were larger and more sophisticated than the single Cape MCC, consisted of four rows, with the first row, later known as "the Trench" (a term coined by Apollo-era RETRO controller John Llewellyn, which, according to Flight Director Eugene Kranz, reminded him of the firing range during his years as a USAF officer). It was occupied by the BOOSTER, RETRO, FIDO, and GUIDO controllers. During Gemini, the BOOSTER position was handled by both an engineer from Martin Marietta and an astronaut, while all missions from Apollo 7 used engineers from the Marshall Space Flight Center.

The second row, after Project Gemini, consisted of the SURGEON, EECOM, and CAPCOM. The EECOM, which replaced the ENVIRONMENTAL controller and some of the SYSTEMS controller's functions, monitored the spacecraft's electrical and environmental systems. Like the CAPCOMs during Mercury, all CAPCOMs in the Houston MCC were astronauts.

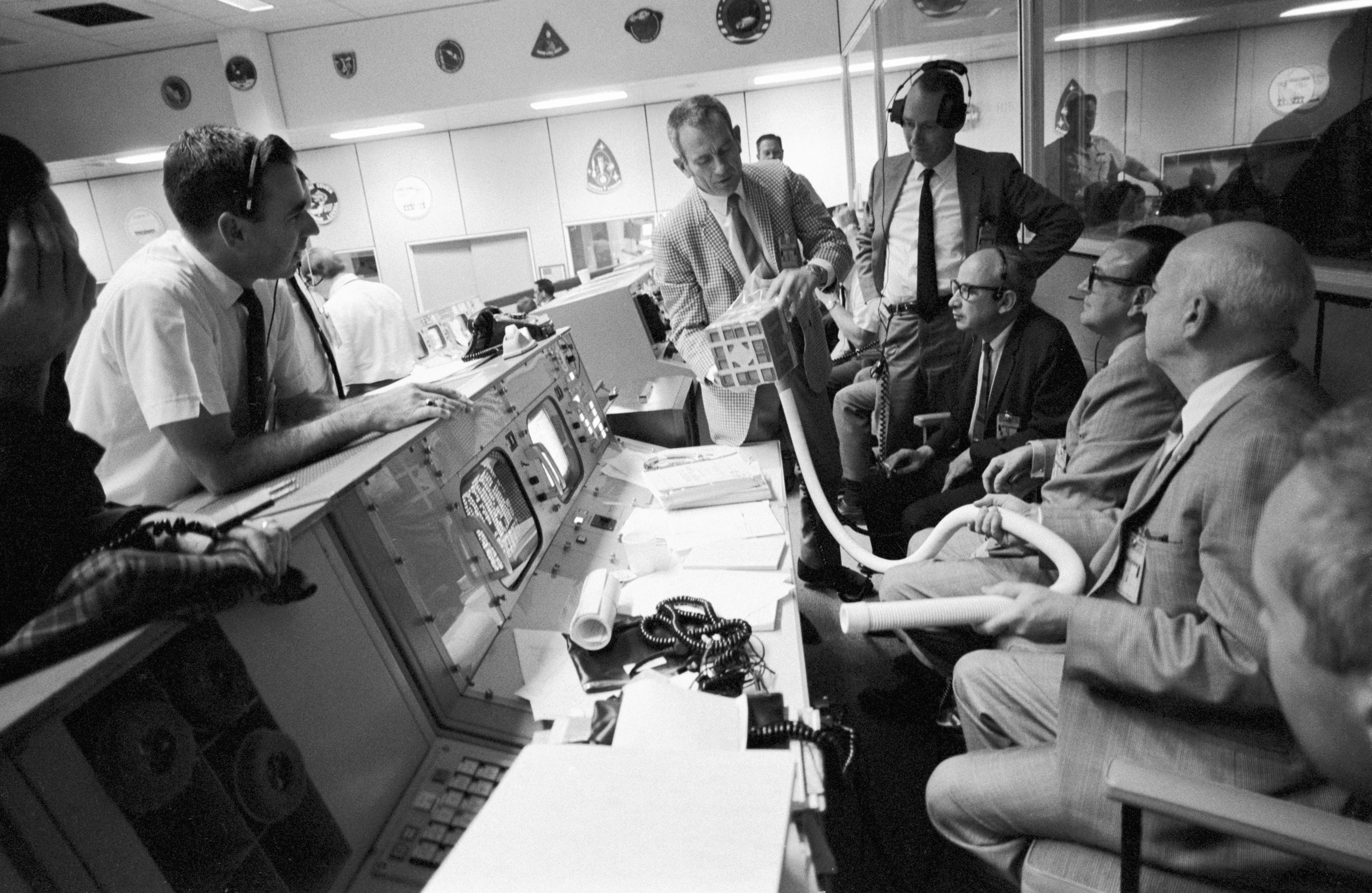
MOCR 2 during the Apollo 13 crisis

On the other side of the aisle of the second row were controllers who monitored specific parts of Gemini, Apollo, Skylab, ASTP and Space Shuttle missions. During the Gemini program, the two Agena controllers monitored the Agena upper stage used as a docking target from Gemini 8 through Gemini 12. For the Apollo lunar flights, the TELMU and CONTROL controllers monitored the Lunar Module. During Skylab, the EGIL (pronounced "eagle") monitored Skylab's solar panels, while the EXPERIMENTS controller monitored experiments and the telescopes in the Apollo Telescope Mount. The PAYLOAD and EXPERIMENTS controllers monitored Space Shuttle operations. Another controller, the INCO, monitored the spacecraft's communications and instrumentation.

The third row consisted of the PAO, PROCEDURES, and the FAO (flight activities officer), who coordinated with the flight schedule. The AFD (assistant flight director) and the flight director were also located on the third row.

The fourth row, like the old Cape MCC's third row, was reserved for NASA management, including the director of the Johnson Space Center, the director of flight operations, the director of flight crew operations (chief astronaut), and the Department of Defense officer.

=== Blue FCR (1998–2006) ===
The Blue FCR, used primarily for ISS operations from 1998 to 2006, was arranged in five rows of three consoles, plus one in the rear right corner. From left to right, as viewed from the rear of the room:

- The front row consisted of ADCO, THOR, and PHALCON.
- The second row consisted of OSO, ECLSS pronounced "eekliss", and ROBO.
- The third row consisted of ODIN; depending on phase of flight, either ACO (shuttle docked) or the CIO (Free-flight Operations); and OpsPlan.
- The fourth row consisted of CATO, FLIGHT (flight director), and CAPCOM.
- The fifth and last row consisted of GC; depending on the phase of flight, either RIO, EVA, VVO, or FDO (reboosts only); and SURGEON.
- In the back, right corner, behind the Flight Surgeon, the PAO (Public Affairs Officer) was occasionally present on a separate single console.

=== White FCR (1998–2011) ===
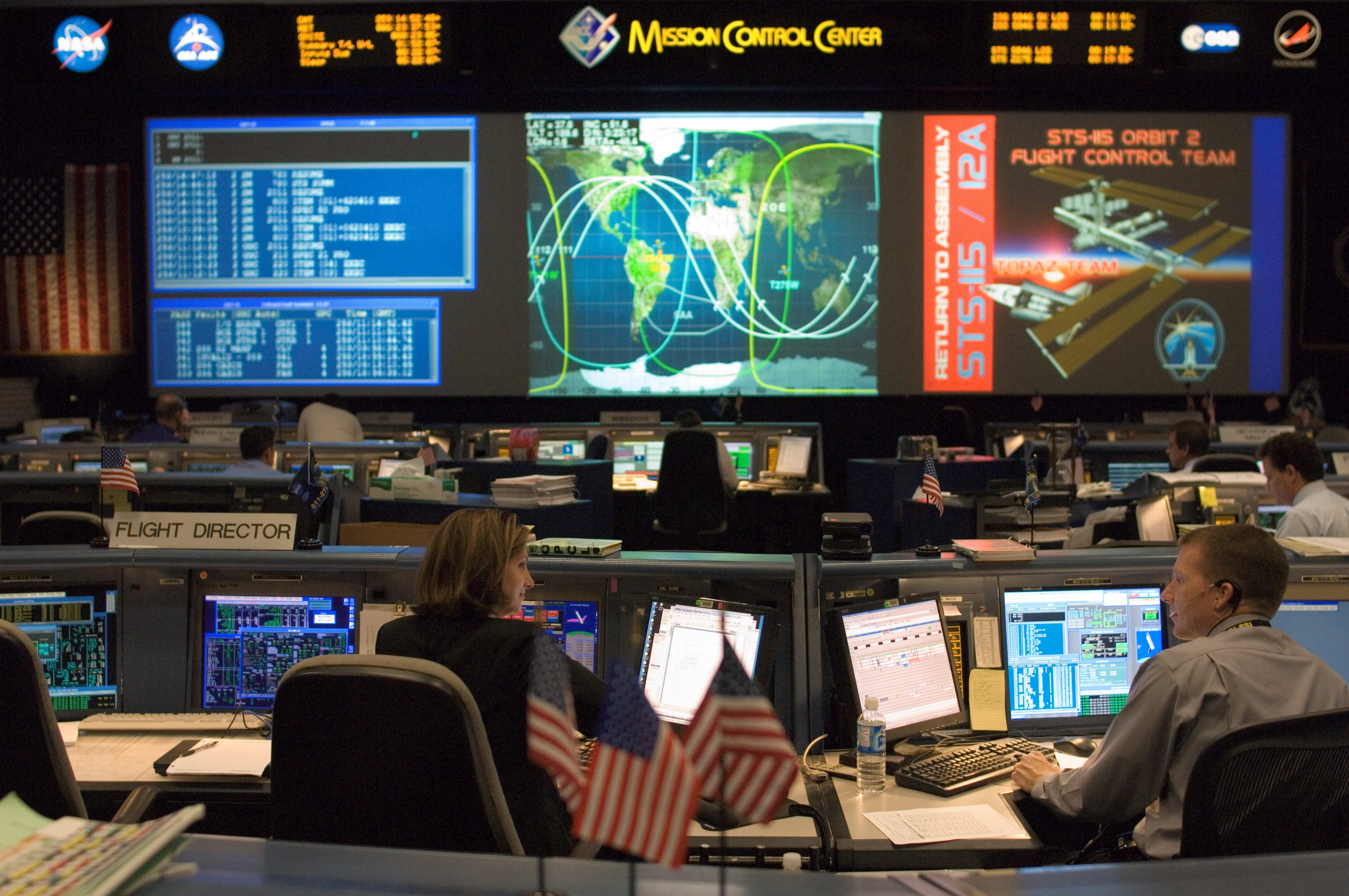
The White FCR during STS-115 in 2006

The White FCR, which was used for Space Shuttle operations, was arranged in five rows. From left to right, as viewed from the rear of the room):

The front row (the "trench") had FDO (pronounced "fido"), responsible for orbital guidance and orbital changes, depending on the phase of flight; either Guidance, a specialist in the procedures of those two high-energy, fast-paced phases of flight or rendezvous, a specialist in orbital rendezvous procedures; and GC, the controller responsible for the computers and systems in MCC itself.

The second row had PROP, responsible for the propulsion system; GNC, responsible for systems that determine the spacecraft's attitude and issue commands to control it; MMACS (pronounced "max"), responsible for the mechanical systems on the space craft, such as the payload bay doors and landing gear; and EGIL (pronounced "eagle"), responsible for the fuel cells, electrical distribution and O_{2} & H_{2} supplies.

The third row had DPS, responsible for the computer systems; ACO or Payloads, responsible for all payload-related activities (depending on whether the shuttle flight supported an ISS assembly flight or not; FAO, responsible for the overall plans of activities for the entire flight; and EECOM responsible for the management of environmental systems.

The fourth row had INCO, responsible for communications systems for uploading all systems commands to the vehicle; FLIGHT—the Flight Director, the person in charge of the flight; CAPCOM, an astronaut who is normally the only controller to talk to the astronauts on board; and PDRS, responsible for robot arm operations.

The back row had PAO (Public Affairs Officer), the "voice" of MCC; MOD, a management representative, depending on the phase of flight; either RIO for MIR flights, a Russian-speaker who spoke with the Russian MCC, known as Цуп, (Tsup); BOOSTER responsible for the SRBs and the SSMEs during ascent, or EVA responsible for space suit systems and EVA tasks; and finally, SURGEON.

=== FCR 1 (2006–present) ===
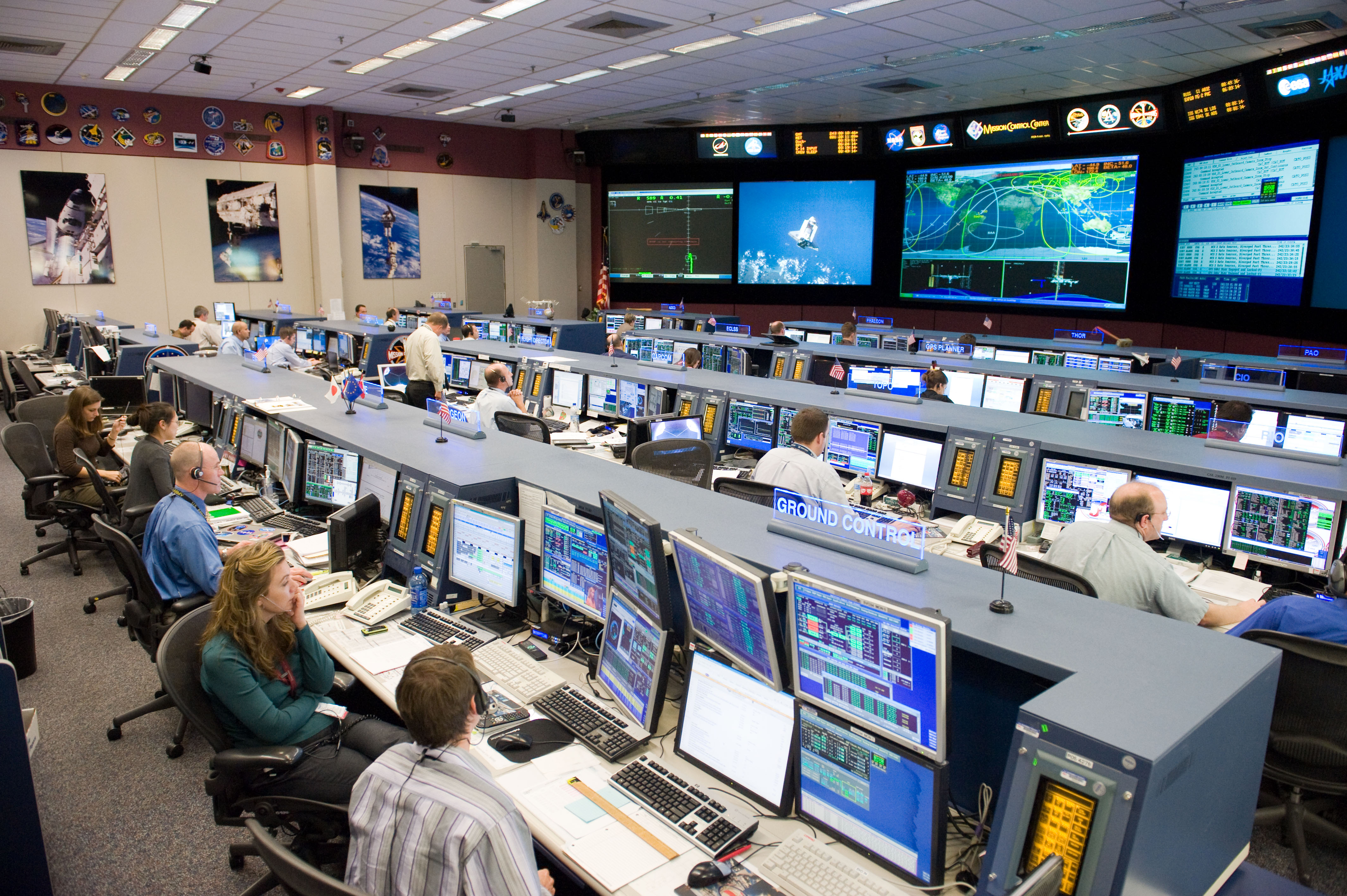
FCR 1 in 2009 during the STS-128 mission.

All US International Space Station operations are currently controlled from FCR 1, remodeled in 2006. This FCR abandoned the traditional tiered floor layout, with all rows instead at the same level. A few engineering specialists are in the center of the front row, with the public affairs commentator at the right end behind a low partition. The space station trajectory position was moved to the third row.

During early ISS operations, a scheme known as Gemini was used, which reduced staffing for real-time ISS support by consolidating six system disciplines into two positions. From these two "super-consoles", named Atlas and Titan, two people can do the work of up to eight other flight controllers during low-activity periods. One position, call sign TITAN (Telemetry, Information Transfer, and Attitude Navigation), was responsible for Communication & Tracking (CATO), Command & Data Handling (ODIN), and Motion Control Systems (ADCO). The other position, call sign ATLAS (Atmosphere, Thermal, Lighting and Articulation Specialist), was responsible for Thermal Control (THOR), Environmental Control & Life Support (ECLSS), and Electrical Power Systems (PHALCON). ATLAS was also responsible for monitoring Robotics (ROBO) and Mechanical Systems (OSO) heaters, as those consoles were not supported during the majority of Gemini shifts. While Gemini officially reflected the fact that two controllers act as "twins" during operations, the name was also an homage to the first missions (Project Gemini) controlled from that room. In addition, Titan was the type of booster rocket which launched the Gemini spacecraft and Atlas boosters launched Gemini-era Agena target vehicles (and several missions in Project Mercury).

In 2010 after ISS assembly complete, the Gemini concept was removed and the six core disciplines were reduced to four. Those console positions are ETHOS (Environmental and Thermal Operating Systems) which consists of the ECLSS system as well as the internal thermal control system formerly held by THOR; SPARTAN (Station Power, ARticulation, Thermal, and ANalysis) which consists of the electrical power and external thermal control systems; CRONUS (Communications RF Onboard Networks Utilization Specialist), a combination of the previous ODIN and CATO positions; and ADCO (Motion Control Systems).

== Backup Control Center and mission control facilities ==
In the event that the MCC-H is unavailable due to a hurricane or other foreseeable event, NASA has the option of quickly relocating to a temporary Backup Control Center (BCC) offsite. In 2017 for Hurricane Harvey, BCC was a hotel in Round Rock, Texas, about four hours away, while in 2020 for Hurricane Laura the BCC was at the Columbia Scientific Balloon Facility in Palestine, Texas, the designated backup site since 2017.

For more long-term use, NASA will relocate to a more robust but farther control center at the Huntsville Operations Support Center (HOSC) at Marshall Space Flight Center for ISS operations. In 2008 for Hurricane Ike, NASA activated Backup Control Centers in both Round Rock and Huntsville for specific duties.

Uncrewed US civilian satellites are controlled from the Goddard Space Flight Center in Maryland, while California's Jet Propulsion Laboratory manages robotic US space probes.

== See also ==
- Launch Control Center in Florida
- Launch status check
- Mission control center
