= Launch status check =

Test in spaceflight

A launch status check, also known as a "go/no go poll" and several other terms, occurs at the beginning of an American spaceflight mission in which flight controllers monitoring various systems are queried for operation and readiness status before a launch can proceed. For Space Shuttle missions, in the firing room at the Launch Control Center, the NASA Test Director (NTD) performed this check via a voice communications link with other NASA personnel. The NTD was the leader of the shuttle test team responsible for directing and integrating all flight crew, orbiter, external tank/solid rocket booster and ground support testing in the shuttle launch countdown. The NTD was also responsible for the safety of all personnel inside the pad after external tank loading, including the flight crew, and received around ten go/no go reports. The NTD reported to the Launch Director, who received a further five. The Launch Director declares whether a mission is go for launch.

== Checklist of firing room positions ==
=== Space Shuttle ===
- OTC – Orbiter Test Conductor Prime
- TBC – Tank/Booster Test Conductor and Tank/Booster Test Conductor Prime
- PTC – Payload Test Conductor
- LPS – Launch Processing System Test Conductors
- Houston Flight – Flight Director at the Christopher C. Kraft Jr. Mission Control Center in Houston, TX
- MILA – Merritt Island Spaceflight Tracking & Data Network Stations
- STM – Support Test Manager
- Safety Console – Safety Console Coordinator
- SPE – Shuttle Project Engineer
- LRD – Landing and Recovery Director
- SRO – Superintendent of Range Operations
- CDR – Mission Commander (Crew)

=== Apollo Program ===
In the Apollo program, the MCC launch status check was initiated by the Flight Director, or FLIGHT. The following "preflight check" order was used before the launch of Apollo 13:

- BOOSTER – Booster Systems Engineer (monitored the Saturn V in pre-launch and ascent)
- RETRO – Retrofire Officer (responsible for abort procedures and Trans-Earth Injection, or TEI, retrofire burns)
- FIDO – Flight Dynamics Officer (responsible for the flight path of the space vehicle)
- GUIDANCE – Guidance Officer (monitored onboard navigational systems and onboard guidance computer software)
- SURGEON – Flight Surgeon (directs all operational medical activities)
- EECOM – Electrical, Environmental, and Consumables Management (monitored cryogenic levels, and cabin cooling/pressure systems; electrical distribution systems)
- GNC – Guidance, Navigation, and Control Systems Engineer (responsible for the reaction control system, and CSM main engine)
- TELMU – Telemetry, Electrical, and EVA Mobility Unit (lunar spacesuit) Officer
- CONTROL – Control Officer (responsible for Apollo Lunar Module guidance, navigation, and control systems)
- PROCEDURES – Procedures, or Organization and Procedures Officer (enforced mission policy and rules)
- INCO – Integrated Communications Officer
- FAO – Flight Activities Officer (checklists, procedures, etc.)
- NETWORK – Network (supervised ground station communications)
- RECOVERY – Recovery Supervisor (coordinated capsule recovery)
- CAPCOM – Capsule Communicator (communicated with the astronauts)

=== Other/Uncrewed spaceflight ===
Varies depending on the type of mission and model of craft, here is one example:

- LCDR - Launch Conductor
- Talker - Person responsible for directing countdown steps as delegated by the Launch Conductor
- Timer- Countdown Clock Operator and person who calls out the T- time
- QAM - Quality Assurance Monitor
- SSC - Second Stage Console
- SSP - Second Stage Propulsion
- FSC - First Stage Console
- Prop 1 - Propulsion 1st Stage #1
- Prop 2 - Propulsion 1st Stage #2
- TSC - Third Stage Console
- MCE - Missile Chief Engineer
- PTO - Propulsion Telemetry Observer
- TM-1 - Telemetry Monitor 1st Stage
- TM-2 - Telemetry Monitor 2nd Stage
- LWO - Launch Weather Officer
- AFLC - Air Force Launch Conductor
- LD - Launch Director

== See also ==
- Spaceflight
- Space launch
- Launch vehicle
- Mission control center
- Launch Control Center
- Spacecraft
- List of human spaceflights
- List of launch vehicles
- Timeline of spaceflight
- Space exploration
- Space logistics
- Spacecraft propulsion
