= Spacecraft naming =

Process of naming a spacecraft

Spacecraft and their missions are given descriptive, sometimes technical names, by scientists, engineers and administrators involved. Space agencies sometimes open the naming up to the public or to school children in the form of essay contests.

== Lunar missions ==
=== Gravity Recovery And Interior Laboratory ===
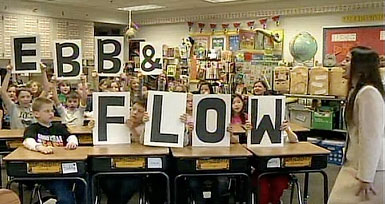
The winning names were suggested by Nina DiMauro's fourth-grade class at Emily Dickinson Elementary School in Bozeman, Mont.

The entry from Ms. Nina DiMauro's class at Emily Dickinson Elementary School in Bozeman, Montana suggesting Ebb and Flow for the twin spacecraft was chosen from entries from 900 classrooms in 45 states. Maria Zuber, principal investigator on the mission commented on the student's research before selecting the names and its appropriateness for a mission measuring gravity.

== Mars missions ==
=== Mars Pathfinder ===
The name Sojourner was chosen for the Mars Pathfinder rover after a year-long, worldwide competition in which students up to 18 years old were invited to select a heroine and submit an essay about her historical accomplishments. The students were asked to address in their essays how a planetary rover named for their heroine would translate these accomplishments to the Martian environment. Initiated in March 1994 by The Planetary Society of Pasadena, California, in cooperation with NASA's Jet Propulsion Laboratory (JPL), the contest got under way with an announcement in the January 1995 issue of the National Science Teachers Association's magazine Science and Children, circulated to 20,000 teachers and schools across the nation. The winning essay suggested naming the rover for Sojourner Truth was selected from among 3500 essays in a NASA/JPL sponsored contest on a heroine and her accomplishments. The essay selected was by then 12 year old Valerie Ambroise of Bridgeport, CT. The second place prize winner was Deepti Rohatgi, 18, of Rockville, MD, who suggested Marie Curie. Other popular suggestions included Sacajewea and Amelia Earhart.

=== Mars Exploration Rovers ===
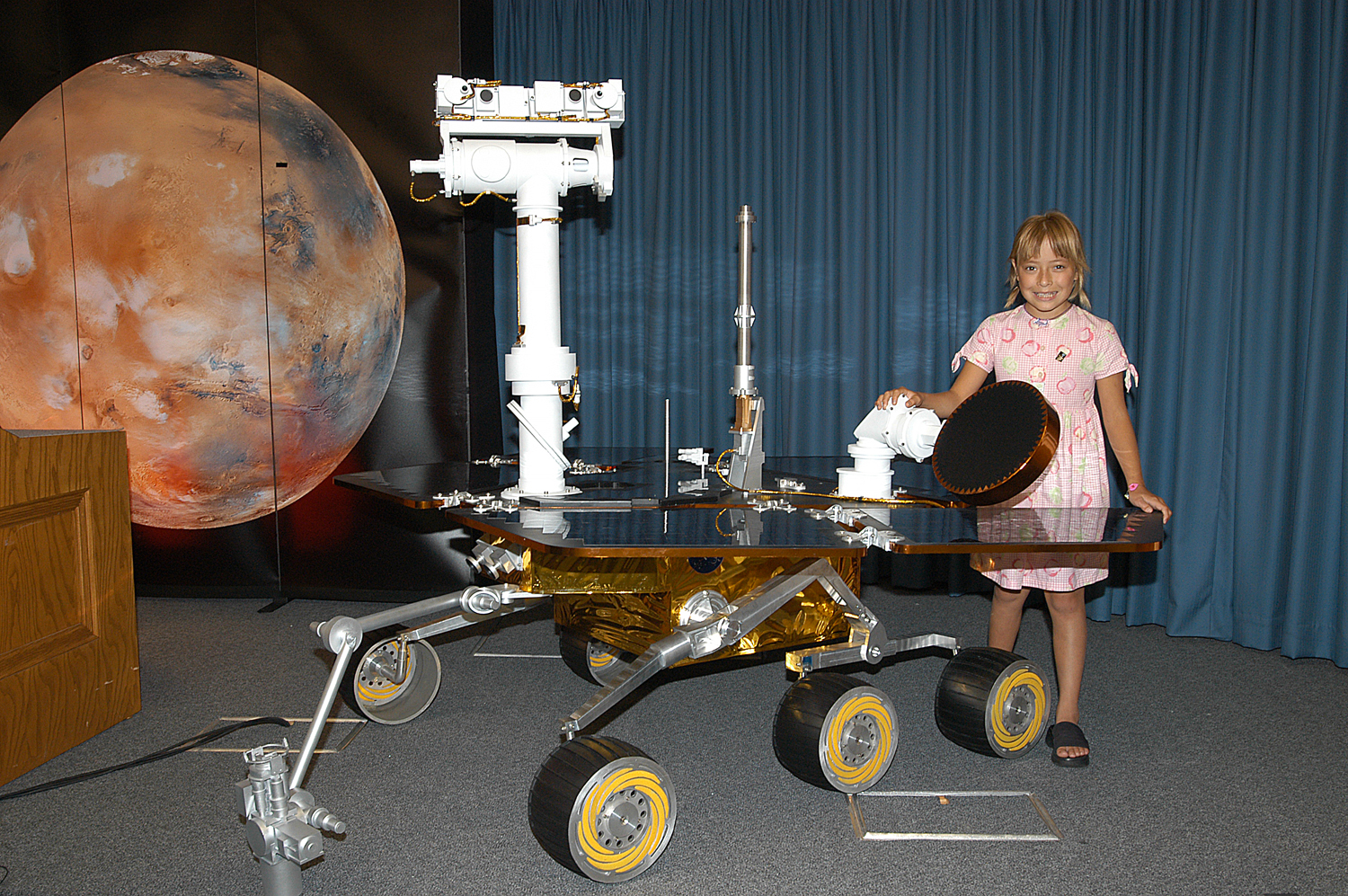
Sofi Collis and a Mars Exploration Rover

During development and construction, the rovers were known as MER-1 (Opportunity) and MER-2 (Spirit). Internally, NASA also uses the mission designations MER-A (Spirit) and MER-B (Opportunity) based on the order of landing on Mars (Spirit first then Opportunity). The rovers were named through a student essay competition sponsored by NASA, the Planetary Society and Lego. The winning entry was by Sofi Collis, a third-grade Russian-American student from Arizona, who named both rovers.

I used to live in an orphanage. It was dark and cold and lonely. At night, I looked up at the sparkly sky and felt better. I dreamed I could fly there. In America, I can make all my dreams come true. Thank you for the 'Spirit' and the 'Opportunity.'

— Sofi Collis, age 9

=== Mars Science Laboratory ===
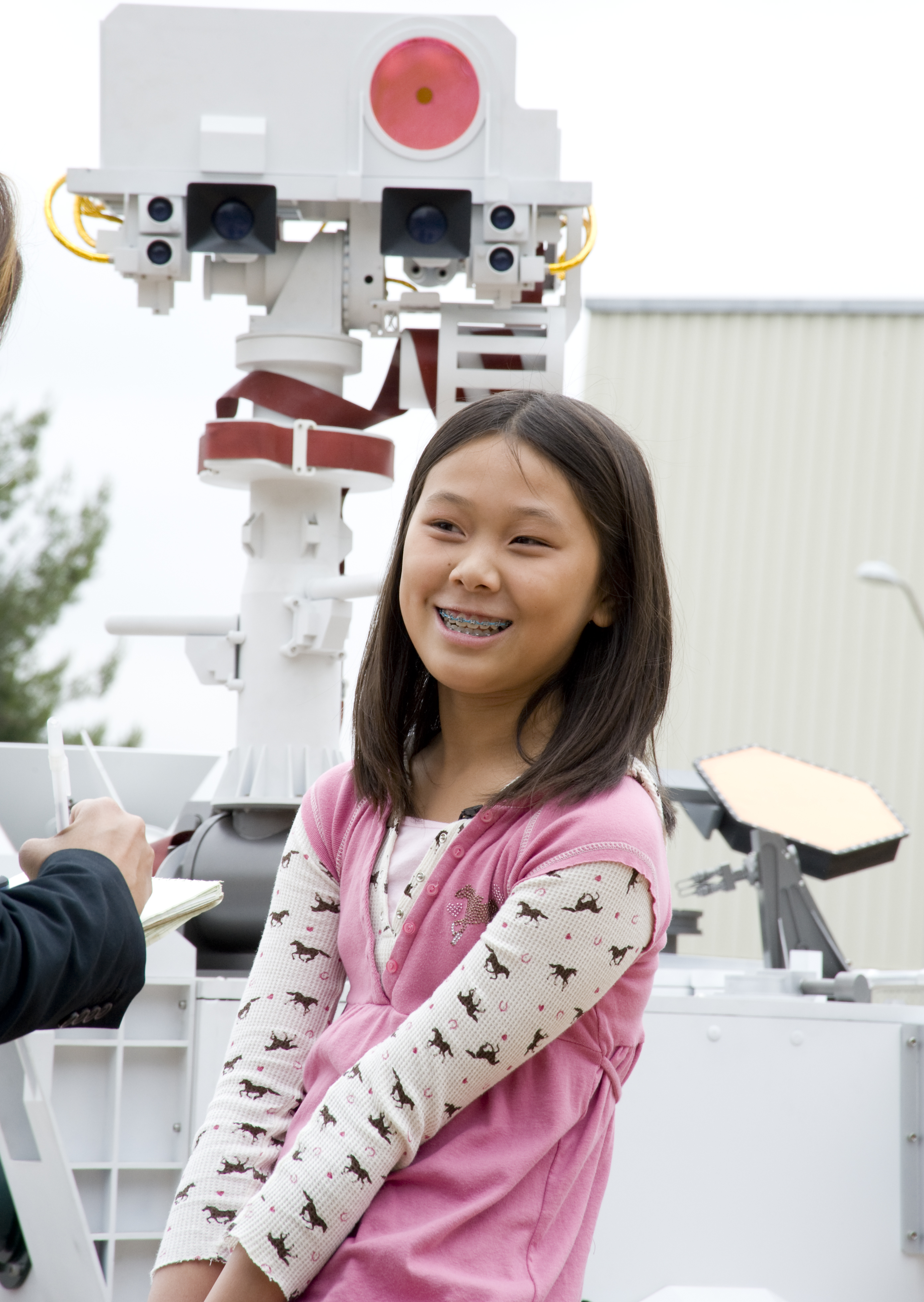
Clara Ma and Curiosity

The mission is known as the Mars Science Laboratory. The rover vehicle was named through an essay contest. Finalist names were ranked by the public between March 23–29, 2009 from among Adventure, Amelia, Journey, Perception, Pursuit, Sunrise, Vision, Wonder, and Curiosity. through a public poll on the NASA website. On May 27, 2009, the winning name was announced to be Curiosity from the winning essay by Clara Ma, then a sixth-grader from Kansas.

Curiosity is the passion that drives us through our everyday lives. We have become explorers and scientists with our need to ask questions and to wonder.

— Clara Ma, NASA/JPL Name the Rover contest

== Space Shuttle orbiters ==
The working name of "space shuttle" was used throughout the program and spacecraft's development and construction. However, Peter Flanigan, Assistant to the President and Assistant to the President for International Economic Affairs to then President Nixon, expressed concern that the word "shuttle" brought to mind 2nd class travel and suggested instead words like "Space Clipper", "Pegasus", and "Starlighter." Shortly after Nixon cemented the "space shuttle" program name in a January 1972 memo announcing the program would proceed.

=== Enterprise ===
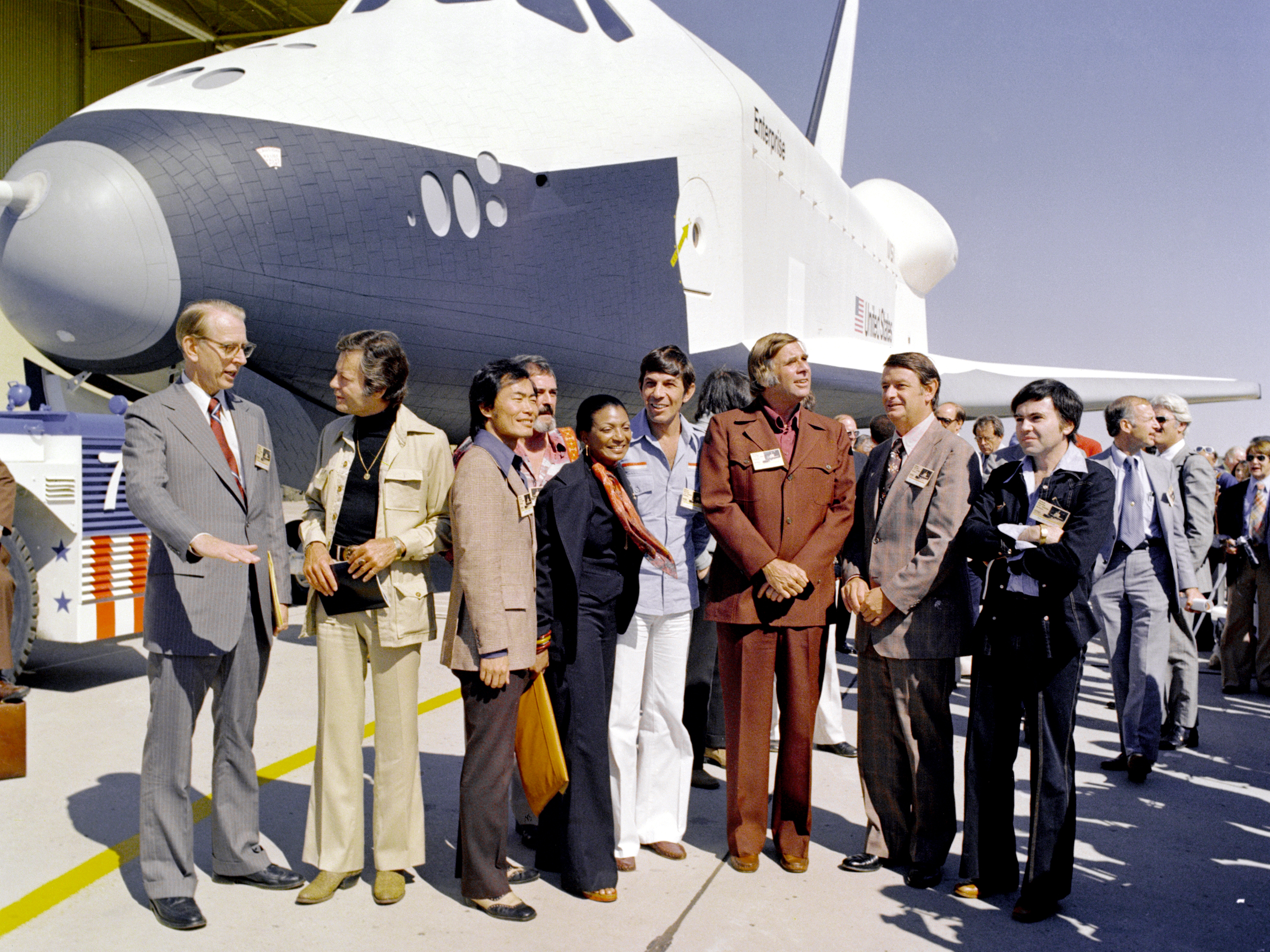
NASA administrators watch the rollout of Enterprise along with the Star Trek cast.

Originally to be named Constitution and unveiled on Constitution Day, September 17, 1976, a letter-writing campaign by Trekkies to then President Gerald Ford asked that the orbiter be named after the Starship Enterprise, featured on the television show Star Trek. Although Ford did not mention the campaign, instead saying he was "partial to the name" Enterprise, he directed NASA officials to change the name.

=== Columbia ===
Columbia was named for the historical poetic name for the United States of America, like the explorer ship of Captain Robert Gray and the Command Module of Apollo 11, the first crewed landing on another celestial body.

=== Challenger ===
Challenger was named after HMS Challenger, a British corvette that was the command ship for the Challenger Expedition, a pioneering global marine research expedition undertaken from 1872 through 1876. The Apollo 17 Lunar Module, which landed on the Moon in 1972, was also named Challenger.

=== Discovery ===
The name Discovery was chosen to carry on a tradition based on ships of exploration, primarily HMS Discovery, one of the ships commanded by Captain James Cook during his third and final major voyage from 1776 to 1779, and Henry Hudson's Discovery, which was used in 1610–1611 to explore Hudson Bay and search for a Northwest Passage. Other ships bearing the name have included HMS Discovery of the 1875–1876 British Arctic Expedition to the North Pole, and RRS Discovery, which carried the 1901–1904 Discovery Expedition to Antarctica, led by Captain Scott.

=== Atlantis ===
Atlantis is named after RV Atlantis, a two-masted sailing ship that operated as the primary research vessel for the Woods Hole Oceanographic Institution from 1930 to 1966.

=== Endeavour ===
The competition began in 1988 and the winning name was announced on May 10, 1989. Contest guidelines had students select a name based on an exploratory or research sea vessel, HMS Endeavour was the overwhelming selection among the 6,154. The Apollo 15 Command Module was also named Endeavour
