= Guidance system =

Device used to guide vehicles

A guidance system is a virtual or physical device, or a group of devices, implementing or controlling the movement of a ship, aircraft, missile, rocket, satellite, or other moving object. Guidance is the process of calculating the changes in position, velocity, altitude, and/or rotation rates of a moving object required to follow a certain trajectory and/or altitude profile based on information about the object's state of motion.

A guidance system is usually part of a guidance, navigation and control system, whereas navigation refers to the systems necessary to calculate the current position and orientation based on sensor data such as that from compasses, GPS receivers, Loran-C, star trackers, inertial measurement units and altimeters. The output of the navigation system, the navigation solution, is an input for the guidance system, among others like the environmental conditions (wind, water, temperature, etc.) and the vehicle's characteristics (i.e. mass, control system availability, control systems correlation to vector change, etc.). In general, the guidance system computes the instructions for the control system, which comprises the object's actuators (e.g., thrusters, reaction wheels, body flaps), which are able to manipulate the path and orientation of the object without direct or continuous human control.

One of the earliest examples of a true guidance system is that used in the German V-1 during World War II. The navigation system consisted of a simple gyroscope, an airspeed sensor, and an altimeter. The guidance instructions were target altitude, target velocity, cruise time, and engine cut-off time.

A guidance system has three major sub-sections: inputs, processing and outputs. The input section includes sensors, course data, radio and satellite links, and other information sources. The processing section, composed of one or more CPUs, integrates this data and determines what actions, if any, are necessary to maintain or achieve a proper heading. This is then fed to the outputs which can directly affect the system's course. The outputs may control speed by interacting with devices such as turbines, and fuel pumps, or they may more directly alter course by actuating ailerons, rudders, or other devices.

== History ==
Inertial guidance systems were originally developed for rockets. American rocket pioneer Robert Goddard experimented with rudimentary gyroscopic systems. Dr. Goddard's systems were of great interest to contemporary German pioneers including Wernher von Braun. The systems entered more widespread use with the advent of spacecraft, guided missiles, and commercial airliners.

US guidance history centers around 2 distinct communities. One driven out of Caltech and NASA Jet Propulsion Laboratory, the other from the German scientists that developed the early V2 rocket guidance and MIT. The GN&C system for V2 provided many innovations and was the most sophisticated military weapon in 1942 using self-contained closed loop guidance. Early V2s leveraged 2 gyroscopes and lateral accelerometer with a simple analog computer to adjust the azimuth for the rocket in flight. Analog computer signals were used to drive 4 external rudders on the tail fins for flight control. Von Braun engineered the surrender of 500 of his top rocket scientists, along with plans and test vehicles, to the Americans. They arrived in Fort Bliss, Texas in 1945 and were subsequently moved to Huntsville, Alabama, in 1950 (aka Redstone arsenal). Von Braun's passion was interplanetary space flight. However his tremendous leadership skills and experience with the V-2 program made him invaluable to the US military. In 1955 the Redstone team was selected to put America's first satellite into orbit putting this group at the center of both military and commercial space.

The Jet Propulsion Laboratory traces its history from the 1930s, when Caltech professor Theodore von Karman conducted pioneering work in rocket propulsion. Funded by Army Ordnance in 1942, JPL's early efforts would eventually involve technologies beyond those of aerodynamics and propellant chemistry. The result of the Army Ordnance effort was JPL's answer to the German V-2 missile, named MGM-5 Corporal, first launched in May 1947. On December 3, 1958, two months after the National Aeronautics and Space Administration (NASA) was created by Congress, JPL was transferred from Army jurisdiction to that of this new civilian space agency. This shift was due to the creation of a military focused group derived from the German V2 team. Hence, beginning in 1958, NASA JPL and the Caltech crew became focused primarily on unmanned flight and shifted away from military applications with a few exceptions. The community surrounding JPL drove tremendous innovation in telecommunication, interplanetary exploration and earth monitoring (among other areas).

In the early 1950s, the US government wanted to insulate itself against over dependency on the German team for military applications. Among the areas that were domestically "developed" was missile guidance. In the early 1950s the MIT Instrumentation Laboratory (later to become the Charles Stark Draper Laboratory, Inc.) was chosen by the Air Force Western Development Division to provide a self-contained guidance system backup to Convair in San Diego for the new Atlas intercontinental ballistic missile. The technical monitor for the MIT task was a young engineer named Jim Fletcher who later served as the NASA Administrator. The Atlas guidance system was to be a combination of an on-board autonomous system, and a ground-based tracking and command system. This was the beginning of a philosophic controversy, which, in some areas, remains unresolved. The self-contained system finally prevailed in ballistic missile applications for obvious reasons. In space exploration, a mixture of the two remains.

In the summer of 1952, Dr. Richard Battin and Dr. J. Halcombe ("Hal") Laning Jr., researched computational based solutions to guidance as computing began to step out of the analog approach. As missiles would become faster, it became crucial to develop a new system due to the speed of the computer hindering the guidance system's ability to accurately and efficiently keep the missile on its path to its destination. Dr. J. Halcombe Laning, with the help of Phil Hankins and Charlie Werner, initiated work on MAC, an algebraic programming language for the IBM 650, which was completed by early spring of 1958. MAC became the work-horse of the MIT lab. MAC is an extremely readable language having a three-line format, vector-matrix notations and mnemonic and indexed subscripts. Today's Space Shuttle (STS) language called HAL, (developed by Intermetrics, Inc.) is a direct offshoot of MAC. Since the principal architect of HAL was Jim Miller, who co-authored with Hal Laning a report on the MAC system, it is a reasonable speculation that the space shuttle language is named for Jim's old mentor, and not, as some have suggested, for the electronic superstar of the Arthur Clarke movie "2001-A Space Odyssey." (Richard Battin, AIAA 82–4075, April 1982)

Hal Laning and Richard Battin undertook the initial analytical work on the Atlas inertial guidance in 1954. Other key figures at Convair were Charlie Bossart, the Chief Engineer, and Walter Schweidetzky, head of the guidance group. Walter had worked with Wernher von Braun at Peenemuende during World War II.

The initial "Delta" guidance system assessed the difference in position from a reference trajectory. A velocity to be gained (VGO) calculation is made to correct the current trajectory with the objective of driving VGO to Zero. The mathematics of this approach were fundamentally valid, but dropped because of the challenges in accurate inertial navigation (e.g. IMU Accuracy) and analog computing power. The challenges faced by the "Delta" efforts were overcome by the "Q system" of guidance. The "Q" system's revolution was to bind the challenges of missile guidance (and associated equations of motion) in the matrix Q. The Q matrix represents the partial derivatives of the velocity with respect to the position vector. A key feature of this approach allowed for the components of the vector cross product (v, xdv,/dt) to be used as the basic autopilot rate signals-a technique that became known as "cross-product steering." The Q-system was presented at the first Technical Symposium on Ballistic Missiles held at the Ramo-Wooldridge Corporation in Los Angeles on June 21 and 22, 1956. The "Q System" was classified information through the 1960s. Derivations of this guidance are used for today's military missiles. The CSDL team remains a leader in the military guidance and is involved in projects for most divisions of the US military.

On August 10 of 1961 NASA awarded MIT a contract for preliminary design study of a guidance and navigation system for Apollo program. (see Apollo on-board guidance, navigation, and control system, Dave Hoag, International Space Hall of Fame Dedication Conference in Alamogordo, N.M., October 1976). Today's space shuttle guidance is named PEG4 (Powered Explicit Guidance). It takes into account both the Q system and the predictor-corrector attributes of the original "Delta" System (PEG Guidance). Although many updates to the shuttles navigation system have taken place over the last 30 years (ex. GPS in the OI-22 build), the guidance core of today's Shuttle GN&C system has evolved little. Within a manned system, there is a human interface needed for the guidance system. As Astronauts are the customer for the system, many new teams are formed that touch GN&C as it is a primary interface to "fly" the vehicle. For the Apollo and STS (Shuttle system) CSDL "designed" the guidance, McDonnell Douglas wrote the requirements and IBM programmed the requirements.

Much system complexity within manned systems is driven by "redundancy management" and the support of multiple "abort" scenarios that provide for crew safety. Manned US Lunar and Interplanetary guidance systems leverage many of the same guidance innovations (described above) developed in the 1950s. So while the core mathematical construct of guidance has remained fairly constant, the facilities surrounding GN&C continue to evolve to support new vehicles, new missions and new hardware. The center of excellence for the manned guidance remains at MIT (CSDL) as well as the former McDonnell Douglas Space Systems (in Houston).

== See also ==
- Artillery fuze
- Automotive navigation system
- Autopilot
- Guide rail
- Guided bomb
- Guided bus
- List of missiles
- Magnetic proximity fuze
- Missile guidance
- Precision-guided munition
- Proximity fuze
- Proximity sensor
- Robotic navigation
- Steering
- Terminal guidance
