= David Hoag =

American NASA aeronautical engineer

David Garratt Hoag
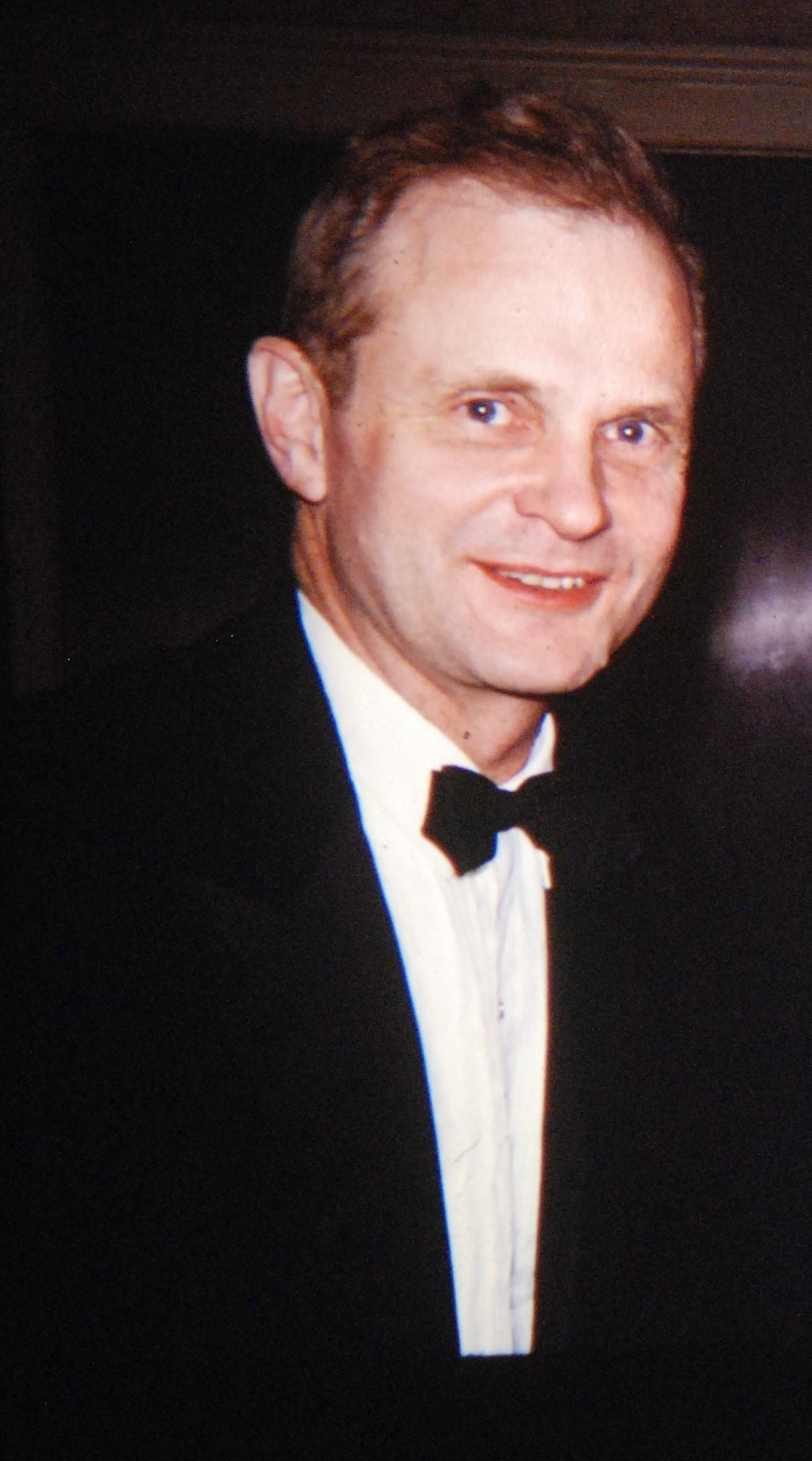
- David Hoag in 1971
- Born: October 11, 1925; Boston, Massachusetts, U.S.
- Died: January 19, 2015 (aged 89); Natick, Massachusetts, U.S.
- Education: Massachusetts Institute of Technology (B.S., Electrical Engineering,1946; M.S., Aeronautical Engineering, 1950)
- Awards: Col. Thomas L. Thurlow Award (1969); NASA Public Service Award (1969); Navy Certificate of Merit (1970); Louis W, Hill Space Transportation Award (1972)
- Engineering career
- Discipline: Aeronautical Engineering
- Institutions: Massachusetts Institute of Technology

David Garratt Hoag (October 11, 1925 – January 19, 2015) was an American aeronautical engineer who was Director of the Apollo Program at the Massachusetts Institute of Technology's Instrumentation Laboratory, later renamed the Charles Stark Draper Laboratory. The Program was responsible for the Apollo Primary Guidance, Navigation, and Control Systems on the Apollo command module and the lunar landing spacecraft. The Guidance and Navigation system included an inertial measurement unit, optical alignment telescope and space sextant, and Apollo Guidance Computer, which was used during the Apollo missions.

== Early life and education ==
Hoag was born in Boston, Massachusetts on October 11, 1925 to Helen Garratt and Alden Hoag. After graduating from the Chauncy Hall School in Boston, he joined the Navy. While in the military, he attended the Massachusetts Institute of Technology, where he received a bachelor's degree in electrical communications and later a masters in aeronautical engineering instrumentation.

== Career ==
At MIT Instrumentation Laboratory, Hoag worked on the antiaircraft fire control systems and was Chief Technical Design Engineer and Program Manager for the Polaris Fleet Ballistic Missile Program. He initially had the same role for the Apollo Program before becoming Director in 1966. The program focused most of the attention on the gyroscopic units. They had to be created in a fail-safe way, as the astronaut crew would be in danger if one drifted, and needed to be carefully constructed to keep the gimbals from freezing and locking up. Adjustments were made and re-tested in preparation to handle the load for the moon landing in 1969. Hoag ensured that all the work was completed to specification. NASA then asked the lab to also take on the work of creating a digital flight control system. The laboratory was tasked to do the programming and test verification of both Command and Lunar Module Guidance, Navigation, and Control computer programs for all the Apollo missions. This comprised 12 missions, 6 being Moon landings. Software verification was aided by the development of both digital and hybrid simulators.

Later, when the MIT Instrumentation Laboratory became the Draper Laboratory, he became the Head of the Advanced Systems Department, where he led activities on precision pointing and tracking, as well as orbiting surveillance systems. With Draper He worked on both NASA and Army programs. He retired as Senior Technical Advisor in 1989 and remained as a consultant for the lab until 2005.

== Patents ==
- Electromagnetic isolator/actuator System---This invention relates to electromagnetic suspensions and, more particularly, relates to apparatus and methods for providing an electromagnetically suspended platform isolated from external vibration and motion and independently controlled in six degrees of freedom by electromagnetic inputs
- Laser Pointing System---This invention relates to systems for aiming a beam of light from a moving vehicle, such as a space vehicle, in a desired direction which is specified by celestial or geographic coordinates

== Awards ==
Hoag received the Col. Thomas L. Thurlow Award in 1969 from the Institute of Navigation, the NASA Public Service Award in 1969, the Navy Certificate of Merit in 1970, and the American Institute of Aeronautics and Astronautic's Louis W, Hill Space Transportation Award in 1972 along with Dick Battin.
