= List of United States college laboratories conducting basic defense research =

Following World War II, the United States Department of Defense (and in some cases after 1977, the Department of Energy) funded basic scientific research at labs affiliated with a number of colleges and universities. Here is an incomplete list:

| Lab | University | Location | Notable work | Refs and notes |
|---|---|---|---|---|
| Aeronautical and Astronautical Research Laboratory (AARL) | Ohio State University | Columbus, OH | wind tunnels, jet engine test cell design | |
| Ames Laboratory | Iowa State University | Ames, IA | separated and studied rare earth elements | (Note: Now funded by the Dept. of Energy) |
| Applied Physics Laboratory | Johns Hopkins | Laurel, MD | development of guided missile technology and drones. | |
| Applied Research Laboratory | Pennsylvania State University | State College, PA | hydrodynamics and acoustics research | |
| Applied Research Laboratory for Intelligence and Security | University of Maryland | College Park, MD | social and behavioral sciences, AI, and computing | |
| Argonne Lab | University of Chicago | Lemont, IL | highly sensitive instruments and technologies to detect chemical, biological, and radioactive threats | |
| Cornell Aeronautical Lab | Cornell University | Buffalo, NY | wind tunnel, seat belt testing | (Note: Divested in 1972) |
| Draper Lab | MIT | Cambridge, MA | guidance systems for Project Apollo and the Polaris missile | (Note: Divested in 1973) |
| Fermilab | University of Chicago | Batavia, IL | discovery of the top quark | |
| Georgia Tech Research Institute | Georgia Institute of Technology | Atlanta, GA | Radar, energy and electromagnetics work | |
| Idaho National Laboratory | Idaho State University, University of Idaho, Boise State University | Idaho Falls, ID | first nuclear-powered electric generator; designed and tested reactors for naval submarines | |
| Jet Propulsion Laboratory (JPL) | California Institute of Technology | Pasadena, CA | Developed ballistic missiles in its early days and currently collaborates with several US military agencies | |
| Lawrence Berkeley | University of California | Berkeley, CA | Manhattan Project, electromagnetic enrichment of uranium | |
| Lawrence Livermore | University of California | Livermore, CA | home to some of the world's most powerful computer systems | |
| Lincoln Lab | MIT | Lexington, MA | Semi-Automatic Ground Environment (SAGE), TX-0 computer | |
| Los Alamos | University of California | Los Alamos, NM | Manhattan Project | |
| Oak Ridge | University of Tennessee | Oak Ridge, TN | Spallation Neutron Source and the High Flux Isotope Reactor. | |
| Physical Science Laboratory (PSL) | New Mexico State University | Las Cruces, NM | National Security Involvement, Missile Telemetry & Electronic Warfare Analysis, UAS Flight Testing, Cybersecurity, High Altitude Ballooning. | |
| Radiation Laboratory | MIT | Cambridge, MA | LORAN | |
| Radio Research Laboratory (RRL) | Harvard University | Cambridge, MA | electronic countermeasures to enemy radars and communications | |
| Sandia | University of California (Note: Until 1949, now operated by a subsidiary of Lockheed Martin Corporation) | Albuquerque, NM | reliability and surety of nuclear weapon systems | |
| SLAC National Accelerator Laboratory | Stanford University | Menlo Park, CA | charm quark and tau lepton; the longest linear accelerator in the world; development of the klystron | |
| Software Engineering Institute (SEI) | Carnegie Mellon University | Pittsburgh, PA | CMM or CMMI;CERT/CC | |
| Applied Research Laboratories | University of Texas at Austin | Austin, TX | acoustics, electromagnetics, and information sciences | |
| Weber Research Institute | NYU | Brooklyn, New York | electromagnetic and microwave defense and communication systems | |
| Information Systems and Internet Security Lab (ISIS) | NYU | Brooklyn, New York | computer and network security, digital forensics, hardware for secure systems, digital watermarking and steganography | |
| Wireless Internet Center for Advanced Technology (WICAT) | NYU | Brooklyn, New York | increase network capacity and battery life of terminals, enhance network security, and structure applications to run efficiently over wireless networks. | |
