= Draper Laboratory =

US research and development organization

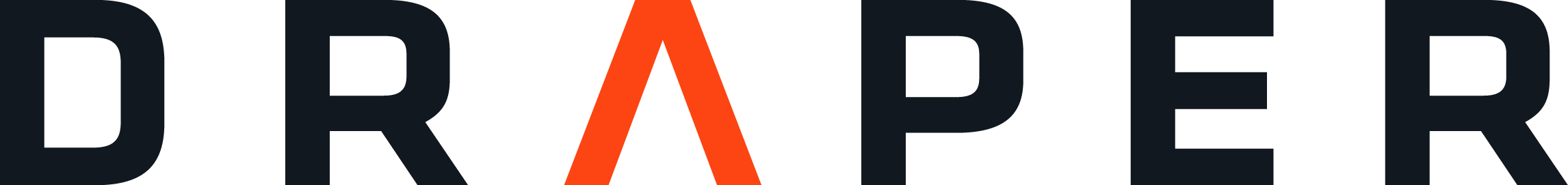

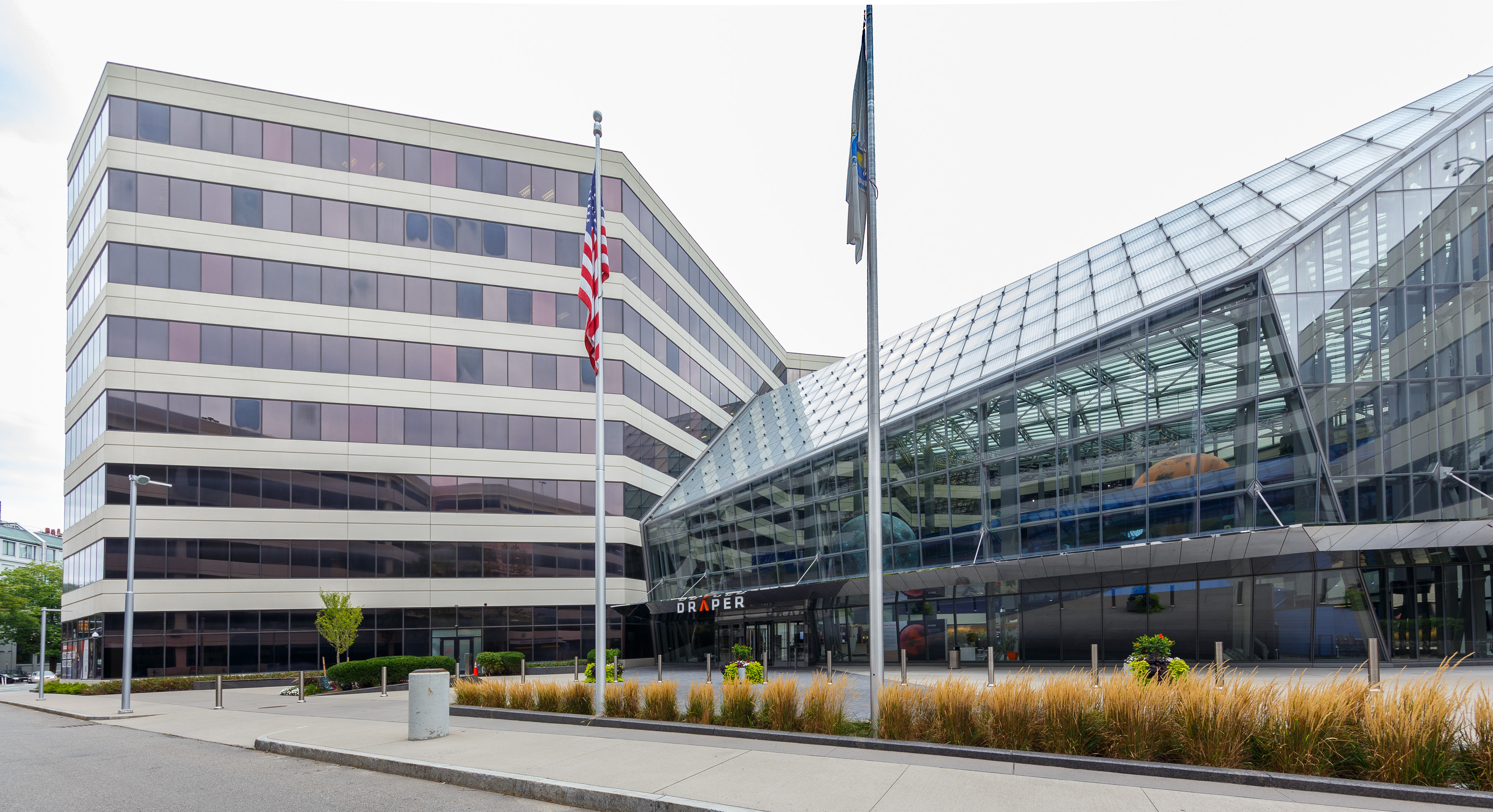
- Type: Independent, non-profit corporation
- Industry: Defense; Space; Biomedical; Energy
- Founded: MIT Confidential Instrument Development Laboratory (1932); The Charles Stark Draper Laboratory, Inc. (1973)
- Headquarters: 555 Technology Square, Cambridge, MA 02139-3563
- Key people: Dr. Jerry M. Wohletz, President and CEO (2022–)
- Revenue: $765 million (fiscal year 2023)
- Number of employees: 2,000
- Website: www.draper.com

Draper Laboratory (officially The Charles Stark Draper Laboratory, Inc.) is an American non-profit research and development organization, headquartered in Cambridge, Massachusetts. The laboratory specializes in the design, development, and deployment of advanced technology solutions to problems in national security, defence, space exploration, health care and energy.

The laboratory was founded in 1932 by Charles Stark Draper at the Massachusetts Institute of Technology (MIT) to develop aeronautical instrumentation, and came to be called the MIT Instrumentation Laboratory. During this period the laboratory is best known for developing the Apollo Guidance Computer, the first silicon integrated circuit-based computer. It was renamed for its founder in 1970, and separated from MIT in 1973 to become an independent, non-profit organization.

The expertise of the laboratory staff includes the areas of guidance, navigation, and control technologies and systems; fault-tolerant computing; advanced algorithms and software systems; modeling and simulation; and microelectromechanical systems and multichip module technology.

== History ==
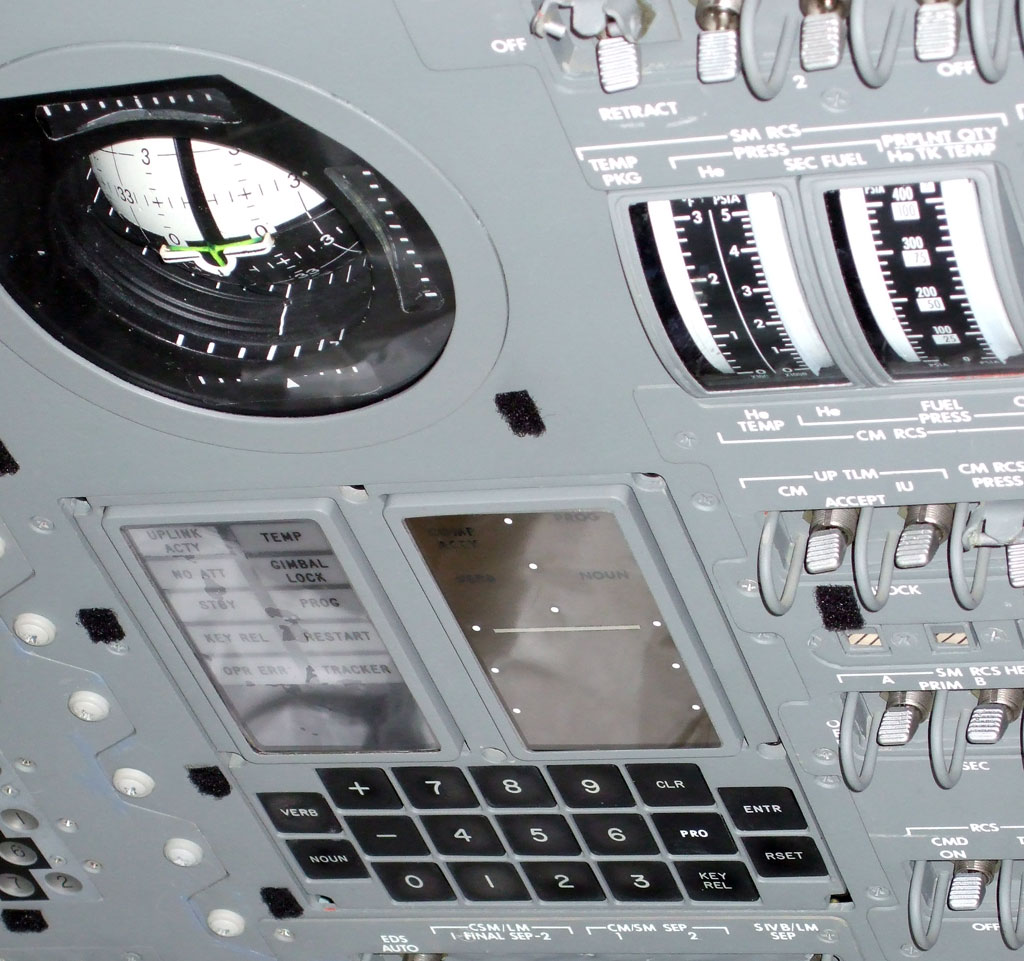
The display and keyboard (DSKY) interface of the Apollo Guidance Computer, mounted on the control panel of the Command Module, with the Flight Director Attitude Indicator (FDAI) above.

In 1932 Charles Stark Draper, an MIT aeronautics professor, founded a teaching laboratory to develop the instrumentation needed for tracking, controlling and navigating aircraft. During World War II, Draper's lab was known as the Confidential Instrument Development Laboratory. Later, the name was changed to the MIT Instrumentation Laboratory or I-Lab. As of 1970, it was located at 45 Osborn Street in Cambridge.

The laboratory was renamed for its founder in 1970 and remained a part of MIT until 1973 when it became an independent, not-for-profit research and development corporation. The transition to an independent corporation arose out of pressures for divestment of MIT laboratories doing military research at the time of the Vietnam War, despite the absence of a role of the laboratory in that war.

As it divested from MIT, the laboratory was initially moved to 75 Cambridge Parkway and other scattered buildings near MIT, until a centralized new 450,000-square-foot (42,000 m^{2}) building could be erected at 555 Technology Square. The complex, designed by Skidmore, Owings & Merrill (Chicago), was opened in 1976 (later renamed the "Robert A. Duffy Building" in 1992).

In 1984, the newly-built 170,000-square-foot (16,000 m^{2}) Albert G. Hill building was opened at One Hampshire Street, and connected across the street to the main building via a securely enclosed pedestrian skybridge. However in 1989, Draper Lab was compelled to cut its workforce of over 2000 in half, through a combination of early retirement, attrition, and involuntary layoffs. This drastic shrinkage was caused by cutbacks in defense funding, and changes in government contracting rules. In response, Draper expanded its work addressing non-defense national goals in areas such as space exploration, energy resources, medicine, robotics, and artificial intelligence, and also took measures to increase its non-government work, eventually growing to 1400 employees within the decade.

In 2017, a formerly open-air courtyard between the original buildings was converted into an enclosed 20,000-square-foot (1,900 m^{2}) multistory atrium to accommodate security scanning, reception, semipublic areas, temporary exhibition space, and employee dining facilities. The open, airy interior space, designed by Boston architects Elkus Manfredi, features a green wall planting and plentiful seating.

A primary focus of the laboratory's programs throughout its history has been the development and early application of advanced guidance, navigation, and control (GN&C) technologies to meet the needs of the US Department of Defense and NASA. The laboratory's achievements include the design and development of accurate and reliable guidance systems for undersea-launched ballistic missiles, as well as for the Apollo Guidance Computer that unfailingly guided the Apollo astronauts to the Moon and back safely to Earth.

The laboratory contributed to the development of inertial sensors, software, and other systems for the GN&C of commercial and military aircraft, submarines, strategic and tactical missiles, spacecraft, and uncrewed vehicles. Inertial-based GN&C systems were central for navigating ballistic missile submarines for long periods of time undersea to avoid detection, and guiding their submarine-launched ballistic missiles to their targets, starting with the UGM-27 Polaris missile program.

The Apollo software team was led by Margaret Hamilton (who wrote code to provide visual cues when prioritization was working correctly) and included work by programmers such as Hal Laning, Dick Battin and Don Eyles.

== Locations ==
Draper has locations in several US cities:

- Cambridge, Massachusetts (headquarters)
- Houston, Texas at NASA Johnson Space Center, as well as a separate office
- Reston, Virginia Reston Campus
- Odon, Indiana Odon Campus
- Washington, D.C. Washington Navy Yard
- Huntsville, Alabama at NASA’s Marshall Space Flight Center, as well as a separate office
- St. Petersburg, Florida Rapid Prototyping Facility and 16th Street Facility
- Pittsfield, Massachusetts US Navy Integrated Repair Facility
- Cape Canaveral, Florida US Navy Trident Guidance Program Technical Support Facility

Former locations include Tampa, Florida at University of South Florida (Bioengineering Center).

== Technical areas ==
The original logo emphasized navigation and guidance technology; the laboratory has since diversified its areas of expertise.

According to its website, the laboratory staff applies its expertise to autonomous air, land, sea and space systems; information integration; distributed sensors and networks; precision-guided munitions; biomedical engineering; chemical/biological defense; and energy system modeling and management. When appropriate, Draper works with partners to transition their technology to commercial production.

The laboratory encompasses seven areas of technical expertise:

- Strategic Systems: Application of guidance, navigation, and control (GN&C) expertise to hybrid GPS-aided technologies and to submarine navigation and strategic weapons security.
- Space Systems: As "NASA's technology development partner and transition agent for planetary exploration", development of GN&C and high-performance science instruments. Expertise also addresses the national security space sector.
- Tactical Systems: Development of maritime intelligence, surveillance, and reconnaissance (ISR) platforms, miniaturized munitions guidance, guided aerial delivery systems for materiel, soldier-centered physical and decision support systems, secure electronics and communications, and early intercept guidance for missile defense engagement.
- Special Programs: Concept development, prototyping, low-rate production, and field support for first-of-a-kind systems, connected with the other technical areas.
- Biomedical Systems: Microelectromechanical systems (MEMS), microfluidic applications of medical technology, and miniaturized smart medical devices.
- Air Warfare and ISR: Intelligence technology for targeting and target planning applications.
- Energy Solutions: Managing the reliability, efficiency, and performance of equipment throughout complex energy generation and consumption systems, including coal-fired power plants or the International Space Station.

== Notable projects ==
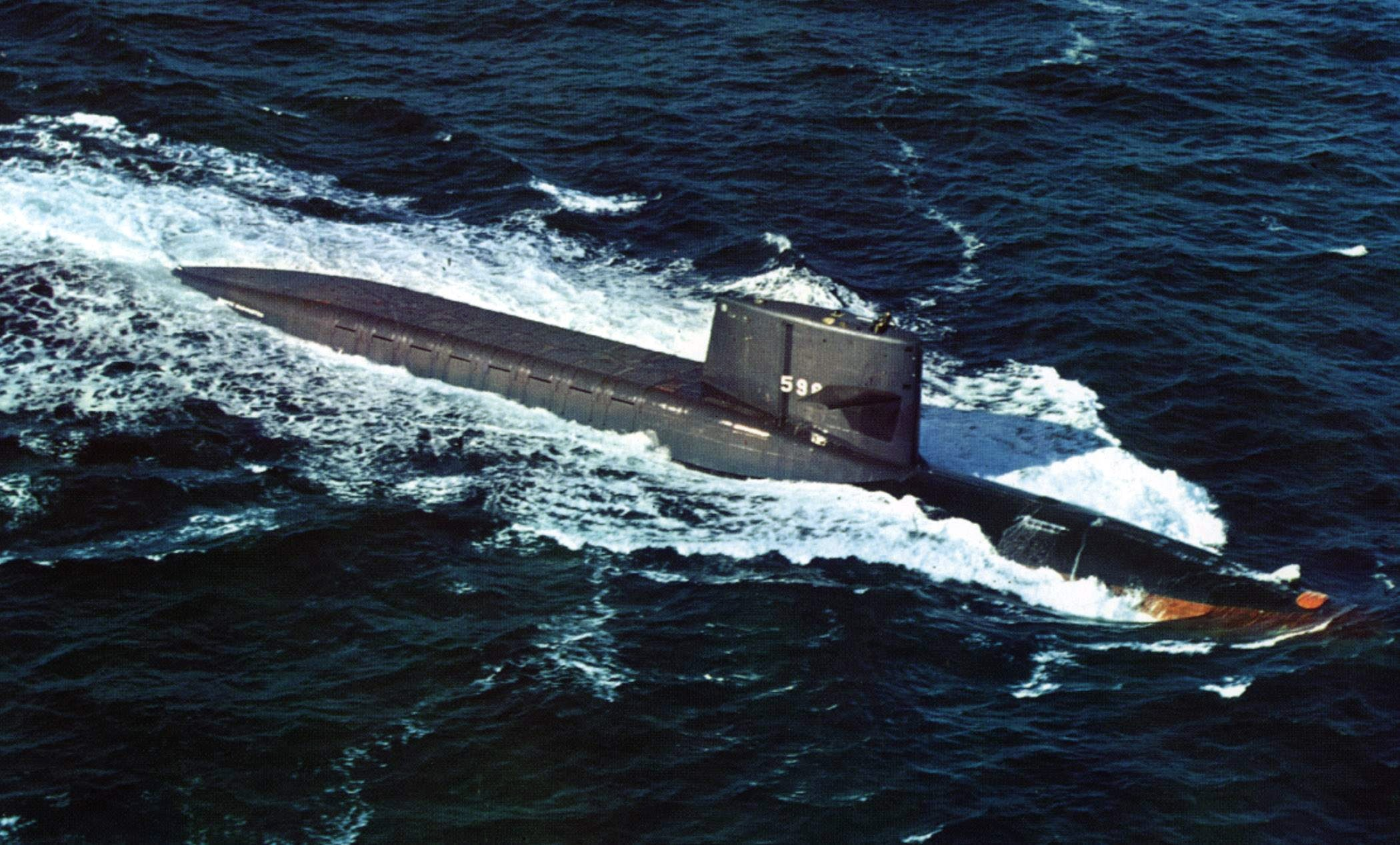
The USS George Washington (SSBN-598) relied on inertial navigation while submerged and its UGM-27 Polaris missiles relied on inertial guidance to find their targets.

Project areas that have surfaced in the news referred to Draper Laboratory's core expertise in inertial navigation, in 2003. The emphasis has subsequently shifted to research in innovative space navigation topics, intelligent systems that rely on sensors and computers to make autonomous decisions, and nano-scale medical devices.

=== Inertial navigation ===
The laboratory staff have studied ways to integrate input from Global Positioning System (GPS) into Inertial navigation system-based navigation in order to lower costs and improve reliability. Military inertial navigation systems (INS) cannot totally rely on GPS satellite availability for course correction (which is necessitated by gradual error growth or "drift"), because of the threat of hostile blocking or jamming of the signal. A less accurate inertial system usually means a less costly system, but one that requires more frequent recalibration of position from another source, like GPS. Systems which integrate GPS with INS are classified as "loosely coupled" (pre-1995), "tightly coupled" (1996-2002), or "deeply integrated" (2002 onwards), depending on the degree of integration of the hardware. As of 2006, it was envisioned that many military and civilian uses would integrate GPS with INS, including the possibility of artillery shells with a deeply integrated system that can withstand 20,000 g, when fired from a cannon.

=== Space navigation ===
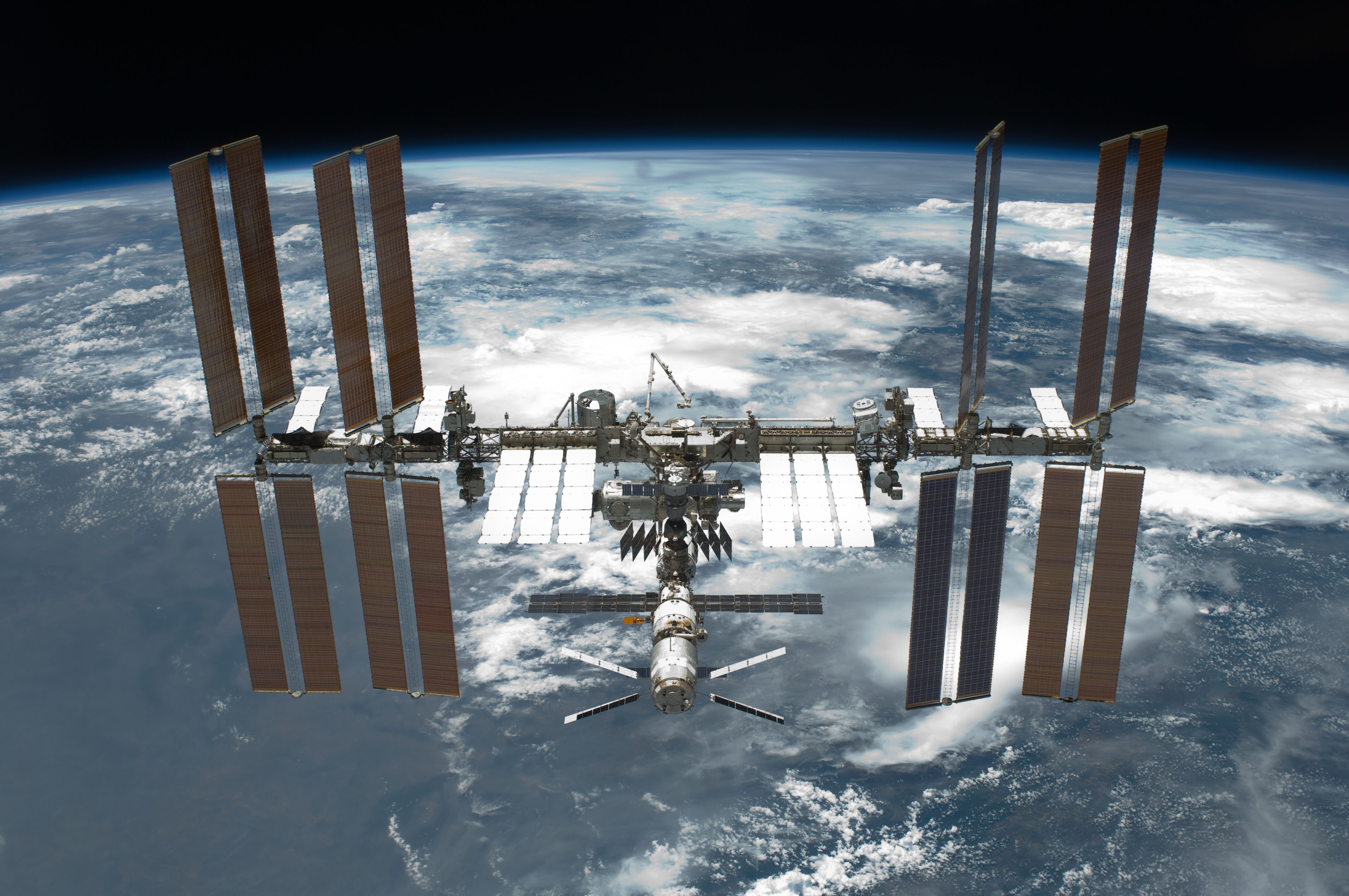
The operation of the International Space Station employs several Draper Laboratory technologies.

In 2010 Draper Laboratory and MIT collaborated with two other partners as part of the Next Giant Leap team to win a grant towards achieving the Google Lunar X Prize, which could be won by sending the first privately funded robot to the Moon. To qualify for the prize, the robot must travel 500 meters across the lunar surface and transmit video, images and other data back to Earth. A team developed a "Terrestrial Artificial Lunar and Reduced Gravity Simulator" to simulate operations in the space environment, using Draper Laboratory's guidance, navigation and control algorithm for reduced gravity.

In 2012, Draper Laboratory engineers in Houston, Texas developed a new method for turning the International Space Station, called the "optimal propellant maneuver", which achieved a 94 percent savings over previous practice. The algorithm takes into account everything that affects how the station moves, including "the position of its thrusters and the effects of gravity and gyroscopic torque".

In 2013 Draper was developing a garment for use in orbit that uses Controlled Moment Gyros (CMGs) that creates resistance to the movement of an astronaut's limbs to help mitigate bone loss and maintain muscle tone during prolonged space flight. The unit is called a Variable Vector Countermeasure suit, or V2Suit, which uses CMGs to also assist in balance and movement coordination by creating resistance to movement and an artificial sense of "down". Each CMG module is about the size of a deck of cards. The concept is for the garment to be worn "in the lead-up to landing back on Earth or periodically throughout a long mission".

A Draper/MIT/NASA team was also developing a CMG-augmented spacesuit in 2013, that would expand the current capabilities of NASA's "Simplified Aid for EVA Rescue" (SAFER)—a spacesuit designed for "propulsive self-rescue" for when an astronaut accidentally becomes untethered from a spacecraft. The CMG-augmented suit would provide better counterforce than is now available for when astronauts use tools in low-gravity environments. Counterforce is available on Earth from gravity. Without it, an applied force would result in an equal force in the opposite direction, either in a straight line or spinning. In space, this could send an astronaut out of control. Currently, astronauts must affix themselves to the surface being worked on. The CMGs would offer an alternative to mechanical connection or gravitational force.

=== Commercial Lunar Payload Services ===
On November 29, 2018, Draper Laboratory was named a Commercial Lunar Payload Services (CLPS) contractor by NASA, which makes it eligible to bid on delivering science and technology payloads to the Moon for NASA. Draper Lab formally proposed a lunar lander called Artemis-7. The company explained that the number 7 denotes the 7th lunar lander mission in which Draper Laboratory would be involved, after the six Apollo lunar landings. The lander concept is based on a design by a Japanese company called ispace, which is a team member of Draper in this venture. Subcontractors in this venture include General Atomics which will manufacture the lander, and Spaceflight Industries, which will arrange launch services for the lander. In September 2023, Draper and ispace were developing a lunar lander called APEX 1.0 to deliver CLPS payloads to the moon in 2026.

=== Intelligent systems ===
Draper researchers have developed artificial intelligence systems to allow robotic devices to learn from their mistakes. This project is in support of DARPA-funded work, pertaining to the Army Future Combat System. In 2008, Paul DeBitetto reportedly led the cognitive robotics group at the laboratory in this effort.

As of 2009, the US Department of Homeland Security funded Draper Laboratory and other collaborators to develop a technology to detect potential terrorists with cameras and other sensors that monitor behaviors of people being screened. The project is called Future Attribute Screening Technology (FAST). The application would be for security checkpoints to assess candidates for follow-up screening. In a demonstration of the technology, the project manager Robert P. Burns explained that the system is designed to distinguish between malicious intent and benign expressions of distress by employing a substantial body research into the psychology of deception.

In 2010 Neil Adams, a director of tactical systems programs for Draper Laboratory, led the systems integration of Defense Advanced Research Projects Agency's (DARPA) Nano Aerial Vehicle (NAV) program to miniaturize flying reconnaissance platforms. This entailed managing the vehicle, communications and ground control systems allow NAVs to function autonomously to carry a sensor payload to achieve the intended mission. The NAVS must work in urban areas with little or no GPS signal availability, relying on vision-based sensors and systems.

=== Medical systems ===
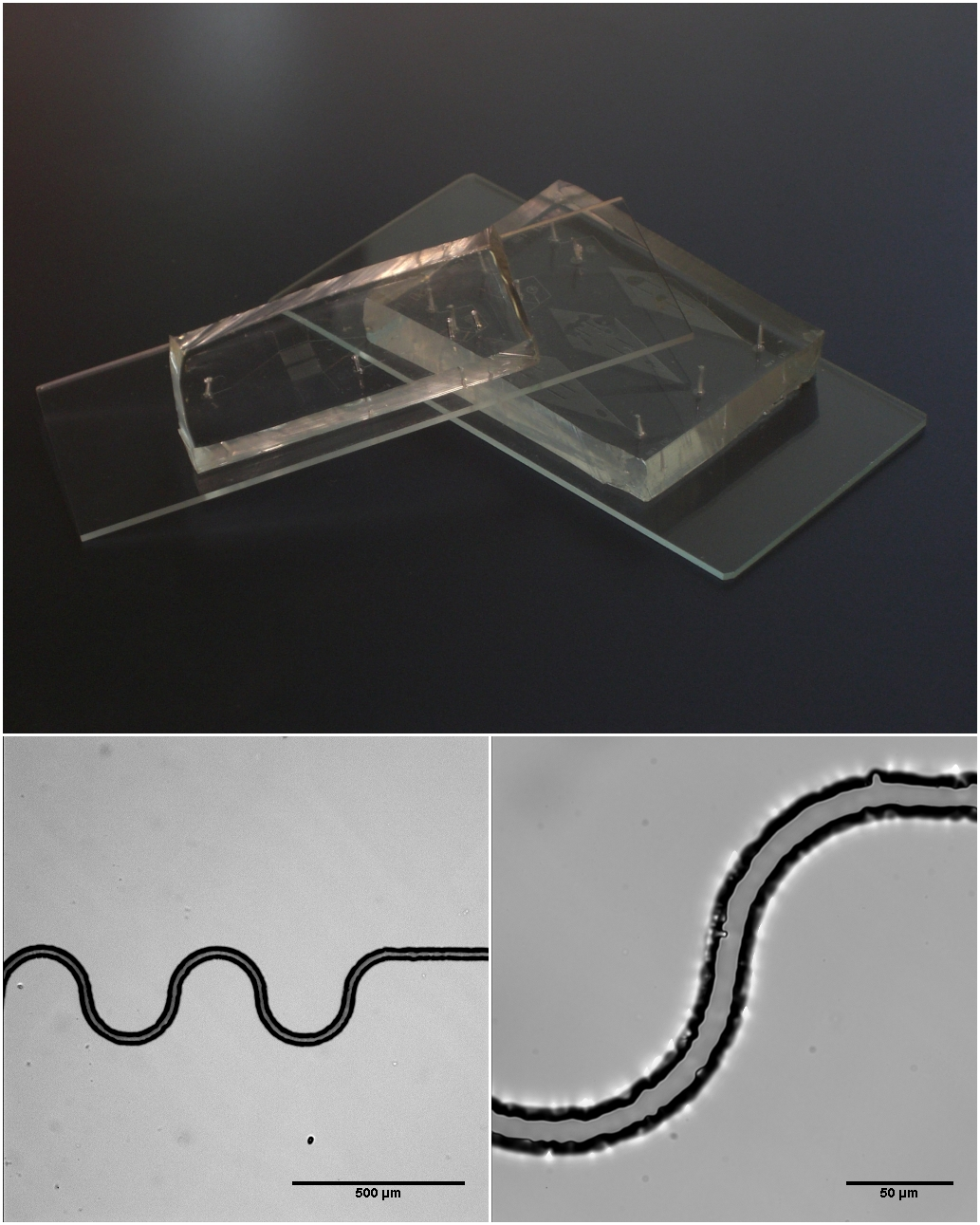
Microfluidic devices have the potential for implantation in humans to deliver corrective therapies.

In 2009, Draper collaborated with the Massachusetts Eye and Ear Infirmary to develop an implantable drug-delivery device, which "merges aspects of microelectromechanical systems, or MEMS, with microfluidics, which enables the precise control of fluids on very small scales". The device is a "flexible, fluid-filled machine", which uses tubes that expand and contract to promote fluid flow through channels with a defined rhythm, driven by a micro-scale pump, which adapts to environmental input. The system, funded by the National Institutes of Health, may treat hearing loss by delivering "tiny amounts of a liquid drug to a very delicate region of the ear, the implant will allow sensory cells to regrow, ultimately restoring the patient's hearing".

Heather Clark of Draper Laboratory was developing a method to measure blood glucose concentration without finger-pricking, in 2010. The method uses a nano-sensor, like a miniature tattoo, just several millimeters across, that patients apply to the skin. The sensor uses near-infrared or visible light ranges to determine glucose concentrations. Normally to regulate their blood glucose levels, diabetics must measure their blood glucose several times a day by taking a drop of blood obtained by a pinprick and inserting the sample into a machine that can measure glucose level. The nano-sensor approach would supplant this process.

== Notable innovations ==
Laboratory staff worked in teams to create novel navigation systems, based on inertial guidance and on digital computers to support the necessary calculations for determining spatial positioning.

- Mark 14 Gunsight (1942)—Improved gunsight accuracy of anti-aircraft guns used aboard naval vessels in WWII.
- Space Inertial Reference Equipment (SPIRE) (1953)—An autonomous all-inertial navigation for aircraft whose feasibility the laboratory demonstrated in a series of 1953 flight tests.
- The Laning and Zierler system (1954: also called, "George")—An early algebraic compiler, designed by Hal Laning and Neal Zierler.
- Q-guidance—A method of missile guidance, developed by Hal Laning and Richard Battin.
- Apollo Guidance Computer—The first deployed computer to exploit integrated circuit technology of on board, autonomous navigation in space.
- Digital fly-by-wire—A control system that allows a pilot to control the aircraft without being connected mechanically to the aircraft's control surfaces.
- Fault-tolerant Computing—Use of several computers work on a task simultaneously. If any one of the computers fails, the others can take over a vital capability when the safety of an aircraft or other system is at stake.
- Micro-electromechanical (MEMS) technologies—Micro-mechanical systems that enabled the first micromachined gyroscope.
- Autonomous systems algorithms—Algorithms, which allow autonomous rendezvous and docking of spacecraft; systems for underwater vehicles.
- GPS coupled with inertial navigation system—A means to allow continuous navigation when the vehicle or system goes into a GPS-denied environment.

== Outreach programs ==
Draper Laboratory applies some of its resources to developing and recognizing technical talent through educational programs and public exhibitions. It also sponsors the Charles Stark Draper Prize, one of the three so-called "Nobel Prizes of Engineering" administered by the US National Academy of Engineering.

=== Exhibitions ===
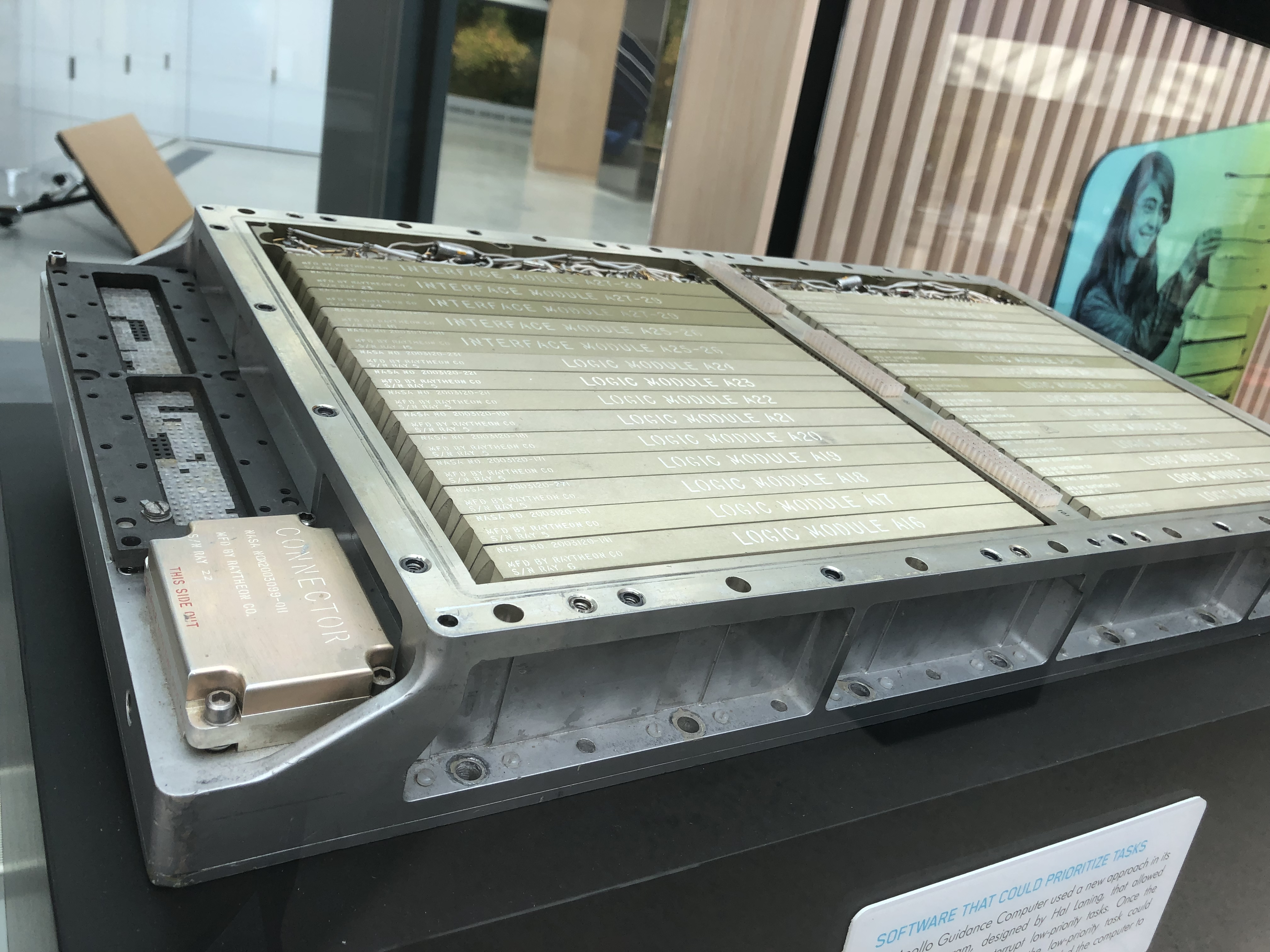
Apollo Guidance Computer at the Hack the Moon exhibition, with a picture of software pioneer Margaret Hamilton at upper right.

From time to time, Draper Laboratory hosts free exhibitions and events open to the public, which are presented in special semi-public spaces at the front of the central atrium space in the main Duffy Building. For example, in 2019 Draper presented Hack the Moon, a celebration of the 50th anniversary of the first Apollo Moon landing on July 20, 1969. The exhibition featured artifacts, such as the Apollo Guidance Computer hardware developed at Draper, and the mission software developed by Draper staffers including Don Eyles, Margaret Hamilton, and Hal Laning. Visitors could practice landing the Apollo Lunar Module on a software simulator, and then attempt to land while riding inside a full-sized motion simulator like the one used by the astronauts to practice the actual mission. Talks by Draper staffers and retirees, and free public concerts rounded out the festivities. A special Hack the Moon website was created to memorialize the celebration.

Other exhibitions have highlighted different aspects of the research projects conducted at Draper, including information about employment opportunities. All visitors must pass through a security scanner similar to those used at airports, but special security clearances are not required to access the semi-public areas.

=== Technical education ===
The research-based Draper Fellow Program sponsors about 50 graduate students each year. Students are trained to fill leadership positions in the government, military, industry, and education. The laboratory also supports on-campus funded research with faculty and principal investigators through the University R&D program. It offers undergraduate student employment and internship opportunities.

Draper Laboratory conducts a STEM (Science, Technology, Engineering, and Mathematics) K–12 and community education outreach program, which it established in 1984. Each year, the laboratory distributes more than $175,000 through its community relations programs. These funds include support of internships, co-ops, participation in science festivals and the provision of tours and speakers-is an extension of this mission.

As of 2021, Draper Laboratory also sponsored Draper Spark!Lab, at the National Museum of American History on the National Mall in Washington, DC. The invention workspace run by the Smithsonian Institution is free to all visitors, and focuses on educational activities for children aged 6 to 12 years.

=== Draper Prize ===
The company endows the Charles Stark Draper Prize, which is administered by the National Academy of Engineering. It is awarded "to recognize innovative engineering achievements and their reduction to practice in ways that have led to important benefits and significant improvement in the well-being and freedom of humanity". Achievements in any engineering discipline are eligible for the $500,000 prize.

== See also ==
- List of United States college laboratories conducting basic defense research
- Bell Labs
- Massachusetts Institute of Technology
- David Hoag
