= Laning and Zierler system =

The Laning and Zierler system (sometimes called "George" by its users) was the first operating algebraic compiler, that is, a system capable of accepting mathematical formulas in algebraic notation and producing equivalent machine code (the term compiler had not yet been invented and the system was referred to as "an interpretive program"). It was implemented in 1952 for the MIT WHIRLWIND by J. Halcombe Laning and Neal Zierler. It is preceded by non-algebraic compilers such as the A-0 System on UNIVAC I .

== Description ==
The system accepted formulas in a more or less algebraic notation. It respected the standard rules for operator precedence, allowed nested parentheses, and used superscripts to indicate exponents. It was among the first programming systems to allow symbolic variable names and allocate storage automatically.

The system also automated the following tasks: floating point computation, linkage to subroutines for the basic functions of analysis (sine, etc.) and printing, and arrays and indexing.

The system accepted input on punched tape produced by a Friden Flexowriter. The character set in use at the Whirlwind installation included "upper-case" (superscript) digits and a hyphen, which were used to indicate array indices, function codes, and (integer) exponents. Like other programming notations of its time, the system accepted only single-letter variable names and multiplication was indicated by juxtaposition of operands. A raised dot was available to indicate multiplication explicitly (the character was created by filing off the lower half of a colon!) The system also included support for solution of linear differential equations via the Runge–Kutta method.

The system was described in an 18-page typewritten manual written for people familiar with mathematics but perhaps unfamiliar with computers. It contains almost nothing in the way of an introduction to computer hardware.

== Sample program ==
The following example, taken from page 11 of the system's manual, evaluates $\cos x$ for $x = 0, 0.1, ..., 1$ using the Taylor series expansion. The implementation is not terribly efficient, and the system already includes $\cos x$ in its subroutine library, but the example serves to give a flavor of the system's syntax. Note that division in the system is evaluated after multiplication and that CP 1 is a conditional branch to equation 1 if the last quantity computed is negative:

   x = 0,
 1 z = 1 - x2/2 + x4/2·3·4 - x6/2·3·4·5·6
     + x8/2·3·4·5·6·7·8 - x10/2·3·4·5·6·7·8·9·10,

   PRINT x, z.
   x = x + .1,
   e = x -  1.05,
   CP 1,
   STOP

== Applications ==
Few applications were written for the system. One documented application, authored by Laning and Zierler themselves, involved a problem in aeronautics. The problem required seven systems of differential equations to express, and had been given to the Whirlwind because it was too large for MIT's Differential Analyzer to handle. The authors, exploiting the Runge-Kutta feature of their programming system, produced a 97-statement program in two and half hours. The program ran successfully the first time.

== Influence on FORTRAN ==
Some sources have said that the Laning and Zierler system was the inspiration for FORTRAN. John W. Backus himself admitted to having contributed to this misconception:

The effect of the Laning and Zierler system on the development of FORTRAN is a question which has been muddled by many misstatements on my part. For many years I believed that we had gotten the idea for using algebraic notation in FORTRAN from seeing a demonstration of the Laning and Zierler system at MIT. (Backus)

After reviewing documentation from the time, Backus learned that the FORTRAN project was "well underway" when he and his team got a chance to see Laning and Zierler's work:

[W]e were already considering algebraic input considerably more sophisticated than that of Laning and Zierler's system when we first heard of their pioneering work ... [I]t is difficult to know what, if any, new ideas we got from seeing the demonstration of their system. (Backus)

== See also ==
- History of programming languages
- Timeline of programming languages
