= Aeronautical and Astronautical Research Laboratory =

Aerospace engineering research facility in Ohio, US

Coordinates: 40.074°N 83.079°W

The Aeronautical/Astronautical Research Laboratory (AARL) is an aerospace engineering research facility operated by Ohio State University. It is the principal research facility of the College of Engineering's Department of Aerospace and Astronautical Engineering. It is located on the grounds of Ohio State University Airport, in Columbus, Ohio.

== Facilities ==
The research activities conducted at AARL are based around a compressed air system that is capable of holding 1500 cubic feet (42.5 m3) of air at 2560 psia (17.65MPa), a 2 MW on site DC power station, and vacuum system capable of holding suction at .15 psia (1.01 kPa). The AARL houses four active wind tunnels (dimensions of test section given in name):

-3'x5'(.9m x 1.5m) Subsonic Wind Tunnel, an open circuit, Eiffel wind tunnel with top speeds of 150 ft/s (45m/s)

-6"x22" (15cm x 56cm) Transonic Windtunnel, a blowdown wind tunnel used specifically for airfoil research

-6"x3" (15cm x 6cm) Transonic Wind Tunnel, a small wind tunnel used to research heat transfer in the high subsonic range

-6" (15cm) Hypersonic Wind Tunnel a blowdown wind tunnel capable of sustaining speeds of M=6

Computers complement wind tunnel and all other experimentation at AARL. LabVIEW is extensively used for experiment documentation and control, while FLUENT and the Ohio Supercomputer Center are used for computational fluid dynamics experimentation.

The most prominent area of research at AARL is jet engine test cell design. Under the patronage of GE Aviation, Ohio State Engineering has been at the forefront of jet engine test cell design for over 25 years. To test jet engine test cell designs, scale models of the interior of the building proposed to hold the test cell, as well as the test cell itself are reconstructed at AARL. The models are incredibly detailed, going as far as to contain scale furniture. Any number of scale jet engines can then be placed in the model, including a 1/12 scale model of the GE90, the largest jet engine ever built.

The AARL houses numerous other research facilities, including the Mechanical Engineering Department's Gas Dynamics and Turbulence Laboratory(GDTL) and Gas Turbine Lab. GDTL works cooperatively with NASA Glenn Research Center and Wright-Patterson Air Force Base researching aeroacoustics and high reynolds number flow related to propulsion. The Gas Turbine Lab is an R&D laboratory that focuses on the development of gas turbine aircraft engines and has an annual budget of over $4 million.
