= Richard Battin =

American engineer, applied mathematician, and educator (1925–2014)

Richard Horace Battin
- Born: March 3, 1925; Atlantic City, New Jersey, US
- Died: February 8, 2014 (aged 88); Concord, Massachusetts
- Scientific career
- Fields: Applied mathematics
- Workplaces: Massachusetts Institute of Technology

Richard "Dick" Horace Battin (March 3, 1925 – February 8, 2014) was an American engineer, applied mathematician and educator who led the design of the Apollo Guidance Computer during the Apollo missions during the 1960s.

Battin was born on March 3, 1925, in Atlantic City, New Jersey to Martha Scheu and Horace L. Battin.

Battin began his career in 1951, serving as the assistant director of the Massachusetts Institute of Technology's (MIT) Instrumentation Laboratory. Battin left the laboratory in 1956, becoming a senior staff member at Arthur Little Inc., but returned to MIT's Instrumentation Laboratory in 1958. He subsequently became the technical director of the Apollo Mission Development program, as well as associate director of the laboratory. Under Battin's leadership, his team created the analytic and software design of the navigation, guidance and control systems for each of the Apollo spaceflights, making the lunar landing of Apollo 11 possible. In 1973, the MIT Instrumentation Laboratory became the Charles Stark Draper Laboratory Inc., where Battin served as the associate head of the NASA Program Department. After his retirement from Draper in 1987, Battin continued to teach at MIT, where he was a senior lecturer in the Department of Aeronautics and Astronautics until 2010.

Battin was noted for his teaching abilities, especially for his work in teaching, mentoring and inspiring many of the leaders in the world's guidance, navigation and control community. Three of the Apollo astronauts were his graduate students. To honor his teaching abilities, the students of MIT's Aeronautics and Astronautics Department honored Battin with their first Undergraduate Teaching Award in 1981.

In addition to being an Honorary Fellow of the American Institute of Aeronautics and Astronautics (AIAA), Battin was also a Fellow of the American Astronautical Society (AAS), a member of the National Academy of Engineering, and a member of the International Academy of Astronautics. Battin's many honors include the 1972 AIAA Louis W. Hill Space Transportation Award, the 1978 AIAA Mechanics and Control of Flight Award, the 1989 AIAA von Kármán Lectureship in Astronautics, the 2002 AIAA Aerospace Guidance, Navigation and Control Award, and the 1996 AAS Dirk Brouwer Award.

An MIT professor in later life, his lecture, "Some Funny Things Happened on the way to the Moon", is available through the MIT Open Courseware program.
