= Richard P. Bordone =

Richard P. "Deke" Bordone (1930 – 21 August 2007) was an American naval officer and aviator. He fought in the Vietnam War and held the rank of captain in the United States Navy.

== Life ==
Bordone was an A-6 Intruder pilot. During the Vietnam War, Bordone earned four Silver Stars, six Distinguished Flying Crosses, the Bronze Star, nineteen Air Medals with seven stars, two Purple Hearts, and four Navy Commendation Medals with Combat "V".

Bordone commanded Attack Squadron 75 (VA-75) and Carrier Air Wing 3. He also commanded the replenishment oiler USS Savannah (AOR-4) and the attack aircraft carrier USS Franklin D. Roosevelt (CVA-42).

Bordone retired in 1980 after 30 years of active service, then served as a vice president with Engineering Professional Services. He was a member of the Early And Pioneer Naval Aviators Association (the "Golden Eagles").

Bordone died on 21 August 2007 in Virginia Beach, Virginia, and was interred at Arlington National Cemetery in Arlington, Virginia. He was enshrined in the Naval Aviation Hall of Honor at the National Naval Aviation Museum in Pensacola, Florida, in 2010.
