= Neil Armstrong =

American astronaut and lunar explorer (1930–2012)

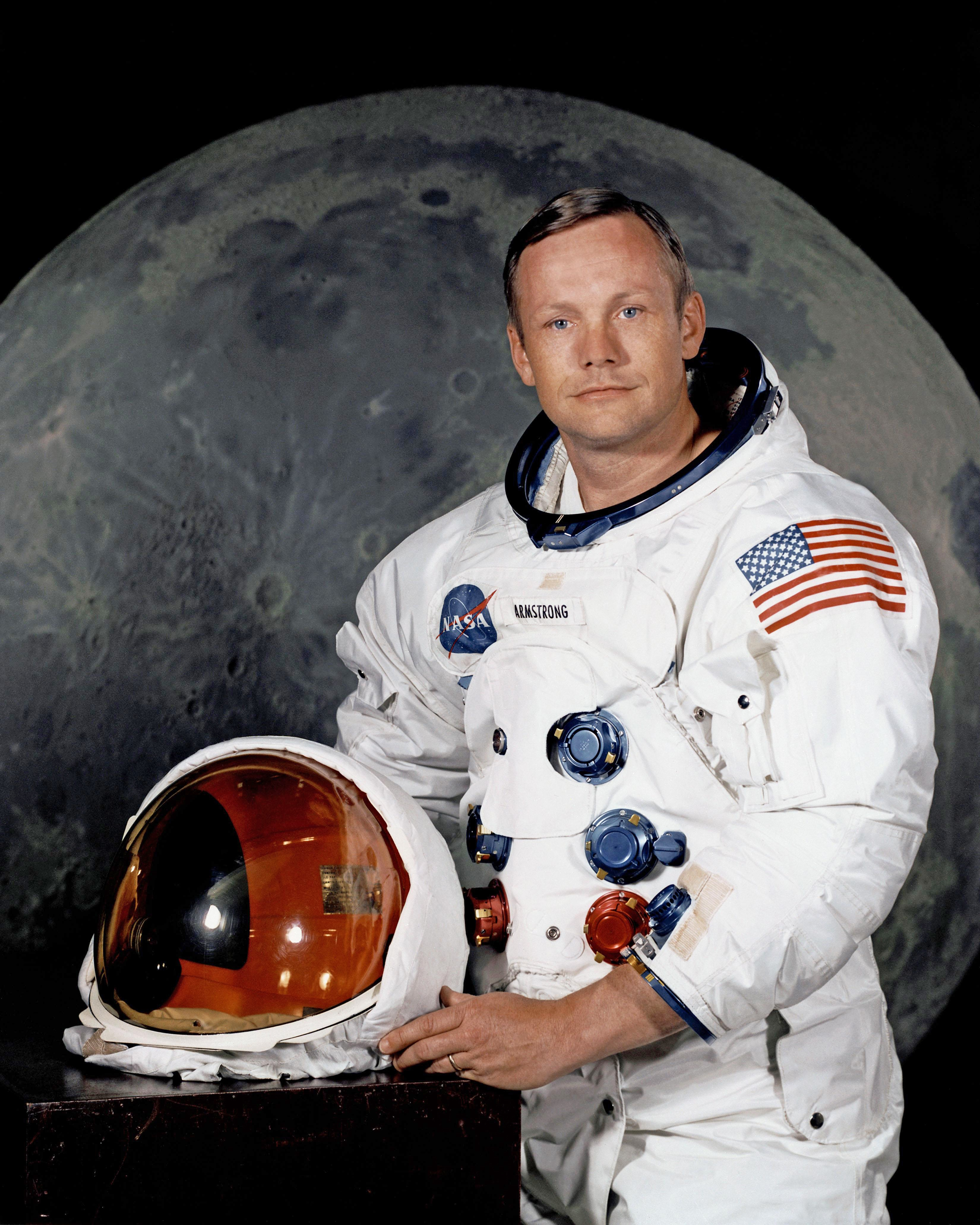
- Armstrong in 1969
- Born: Neil Alden Armstrong; August 5, 1930; Washington Township, Ohio, U.S.
- Died: August 25, 2012 (aged 82); Fairfield, Ohio, U.S.
- Education: Purdue University (BS); University of Southern California (MS)
- Spouses: Janet Shearon (m. 1956; div. 1994) Carol Knight (m. 1994)
- Children: 3
- Awards: Presidential Medal of Freedom; Congressional Space Medal of Honor; Congressional Gold Medal; NASA Distinguished Service Medal; NASA Exceptional Service Medal; Air Medal (3)
- Space career

USAF / NASA astronaut
- Rank: Lieutenant, USN
- Time in space: 8d 14h 12m
- Selection: USAF Man in Space Soonest (1958); USAF Dyna-Soar (1960); NASA Group 2 (1962)
- Total EVAs: 1
- Total EVA time: 2h 31m
- Mission: Gemini 8; Apollo 11
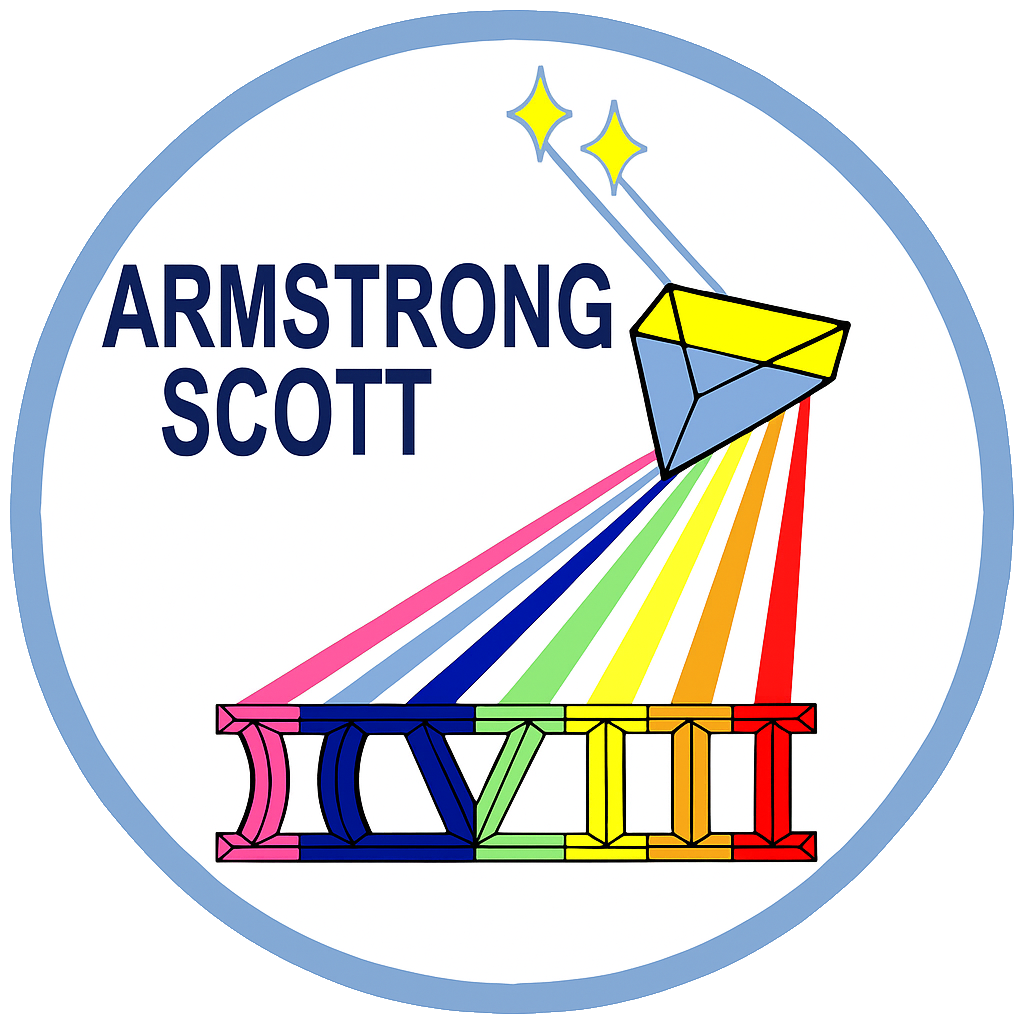
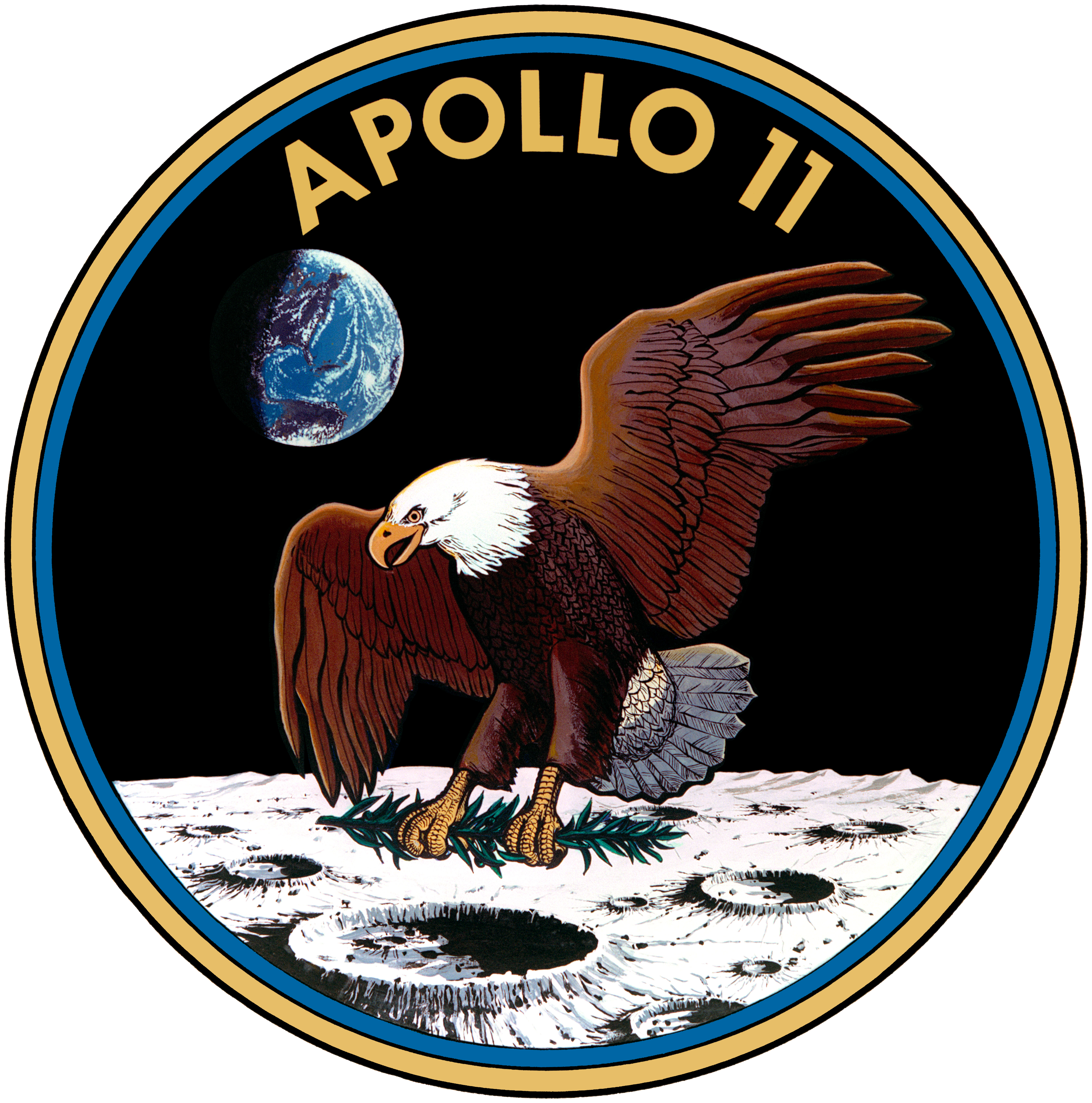
- Mission insignia
- Retired: August 1971
- Armstrong's voice Armstrong's "One small step" speech Recorded July 20, 1969

Neil Alden Armstrong (August 5, 1930 – August 25, 2012) was an American astronaut and aeronautical engineer who, as the commander of the 1969 Apollo 11 mission, became the first person to walk on the Moon. He was also a naval aviator, test pilot and university professor.

Armstrong was born and raised near Wapakoneta, Ohio. He entered Purdue University, studying aeronautical engineering, with the United States Navy paying his tuition under the Holloway Plan. He became a midshipman in 1949 and a naval aviator the following year. He saw action in the Korean War, flying the Grumman F9F Panther from the aircraft carrier USS Essex. After the war, he completed his bachelor's degree at Purdue and became a test pilot at the National Advisory Committee for Aeronautics (NACA) High-Speed Flight Station at Edwards Air Force Base in California. He was the project pilot on Century Series fighters and flew the North American X-15 seven times. He was also a participant in the U.S. Air Force's Man in Space Soonest and X-20 Dyna-Soar human spaceflight programs.

Armstrong joined the NASA Astronaut Corps in the second group, which was selected in 1962. He made his first spaceflight as command pilot of Gemini 8 in March 1966, becoming NASA's first civilian astronaut to fly in space. During this mission with pilot David Scott, he performed the first docking of two spacecraft; the mission was aborted after Armstrong used some of his re-entry control fuel to stabilize a dangerous roll caused by a stuck thruster. During training for Armstrong's second and last spaceflight as commander of Apollo 11, he ejected from the Lunar Landing Research Vehicle moments before a crash.

On July 20, 1969, Armstrong and Apollo 11 Lunar Module (LM) pilot Buzz Aldrin became the first people to land on the Moon, and the next day they spent two and a half hours outside the Lunar Module Eagle spacecraft while Michael Collins remained in lunar orbit in the Apollo Command Module Columbia. When Armstrong first stepped onto the lunar surface, he famously said: "That's one small step for [a] man, one giant leap for mankind." It was broadcast live to an estimated 530 million viewers worldwide. Apollo 11 was a major U.S. victory in the Space Race, by fulfilling a national goal proposed in 1961 by President John F. Kennedy "of landing a man on the Moon and returning him safely to the Earth" before the end of the decade. Along with Collins and Aldrin, Armstrong was awarded the Presidential Medal of Freedom by President Richard Nixon and received the 1969 Collier Trophy. President Jimmy Carter presented him with the Congressional Space Medal of Honor in 1978, he was inducted into the National Aviation Hall of Fame in 1979, and with his former crewmates received the Congressional Gold Medal in 2009.

After he resigned from NASA in 1971, Armstrong taught in the Department of Aerospace Engineering at the University of Cincinnati until 1979. He served on the Apollo 13 accident investigation and on the Rogers Commission, which investigated the Space Shuttle Challenger disaster. In 2012, Armstrong died due to complications resulting from coronary bypass surgery, at the age of 82.

== Early life and education ==
Armstrong was born in rural Washington Township, in Auglaize County, Ohio, on August 5, 1930, the son of Viola Louise (née Engel) and Stephen Koenig Armstrong. He was of German, English, Scots-Irish, Irish, and Scottish descent. He is a descendant of Clan Armstrong. He had a younger sister, June, and a younger brother, Dean. His father was an auditor for the Ohio state government, and the family moved around the state repeatedly, living in 16 towns over the next 14 years. Armstrong's love for flying grew during this time, having started at the age of two when his father took him to the Cleveland Air Races. When he was five or six, he experienced his first airplane flight in Warren, Ohio, when he and his father took a ride in a Ford Trimotor (also known as the "Tin Goose"). Armstrong constructed and flew model aircraft, beginning in his youth.

The family's last move was in 1944 and took them back to Wapakoneta, where Armstrong attended Blume High School and took flying lessons at the Wapakoneta airfield. He earned a student flight certificate on his 16th birthday, then soloed in August, all before he had a driver's license. He was an active Boy Scout and earned the rank of Eagle Scout. As an adult, he was recognized by the Scouts with their Distinguished Eagle Scout Award and Silver Buffalo Award. While flying toward the Moon on July 18, 1969, he sent his regards to attendees at the National Scout jamboree in Idaho. Among the few personal items that he carried with him to the Moon and back was a World Scout Badge.

At age 17, in 1947, Armstrong began studying aeronautical engineering at Purdue University in West Lafayette, Indiana; he was the second person in his family to attend college. Armstrong was also accepted to the Massachusetts Institute of Technology (MIT), but he resolved to go to Purdue after watching a football game between the Purdue Boilermakers and the Ohio State Buckeyes at the Ohio Stadium in 1945 in which quarterback Bob DeMoss led the Boilermakers to a sound victory over the highly regarded Buckeyes. An uncle who attended MIT had also advised him that he could receive a good education without going all the way to Cambridge, Massachusetts. His college tuition was paid for under the Holloway Plan. Successful applicants committed to two years of study, followed by two years of flight training and one year of service as an aviator in the U.S. Navy, then completion of the final two years of their bachelor's degree. Armstrong did not take courses in naval science, nor did he join the Naval Reserve Officers Training Corps.

== Naval service ==
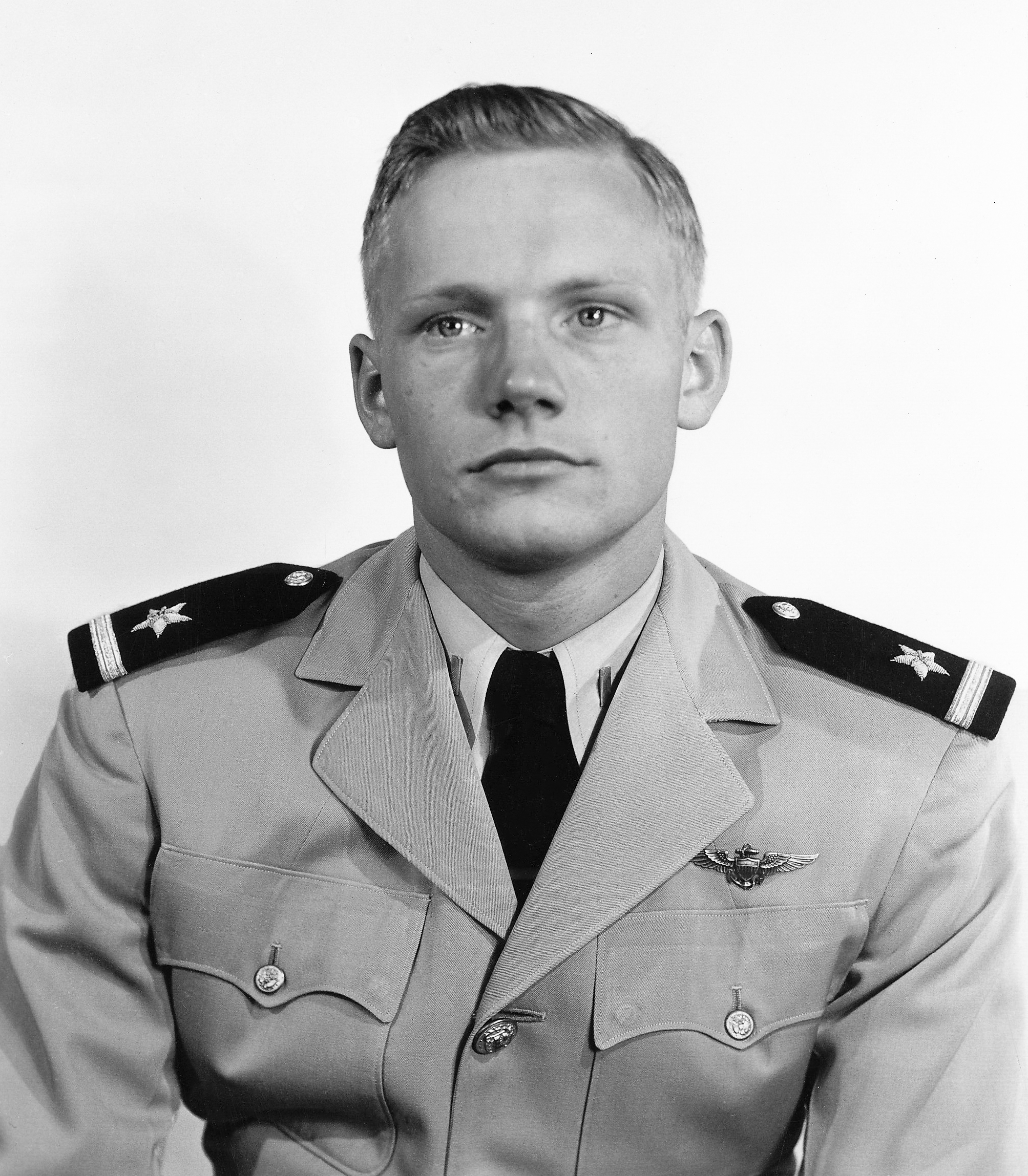
Ensign Neil Armstrong on May 23, 1952

Armstrong's call-up from the Navy arrived on January 26, 1949, requiring him to report to Naval Air Station Pensacola in Florida for flight training with class 5-49. After passing the medical examinations, he became a midshipman on February 24, 1949. Flight training was conducted in a North American SNJ trainer, in which he soloed on September 9, 1949. On March 2, 1950, he made his first aircraft carrier landing on USS Cabot, an achievement he considered comparable to his first solo flight. He was then sent to Naval Air Station Corpus Christi in Texas for training on the Grumman F8F Bearcat, culminating in a carrier landing on USS Wright. On August 16, 1950, Armstrong was informed by letter that he was a fully qualified naval aviator. His mother and sister attended his graduation ceremony on August 23, 1950.

Armstrong was assigned to Fleet Aircraft Service Squadron 7 (FASRON 7) at NAS San Diego (now known as NAS North Island). On November 27, 1950, he was assigned to VF-51, an all-jet squadron, becoming its youngest officer, and made his first flight in a jet, a Grumman F9F Panther, on January 5, 1951. He was promoted to ensign on June 5, 1951, and made his first jet carrier landing on USS Essex two days later. On June 28, 1951, Essex had set sail for Korea, with VF-51 aboard to act as ground-attack aircraft. VF-51 flew ahead to Naval Air Station Barbers Point in Hawaii, where it conducted fighter-bomber training before rejoining the ship at the end of July.

On August 29, 1951, Armstrong saw action in the Korean War as an escort for a photo reconnaissance plane over Songjin. Five days later, on September 3, he flew armed reconnaissance over the primary transportation and storage facilities south of the village of Majon-ni, west of Wonsan. According to Armstrong, he was making a low bombing run at 350 mph (560 km/h) when 6 feet (1.8 m) of his wing was torn off after it collided with a cable that was strung across the hills as a booby trap. He was flying 500 feet (150 m) above the ground when he hit it. While there was heavy anti-aircraft fire in the area, none hit Armstrong's aircraft. An initial report to the commanding officer of Essex said that Armstrong's F9F Panther was hit by anti-aircraft fire. The report indicated he was trying to regain control and collided with a pole, which sliced off 2 feet (0.61 m) of the Panther's right wing. Further perversions of the story by different authors added that he was only 20 feet (6.1 m) from the ground and that 3 feet (0.91 m) of his wing was sheared off.

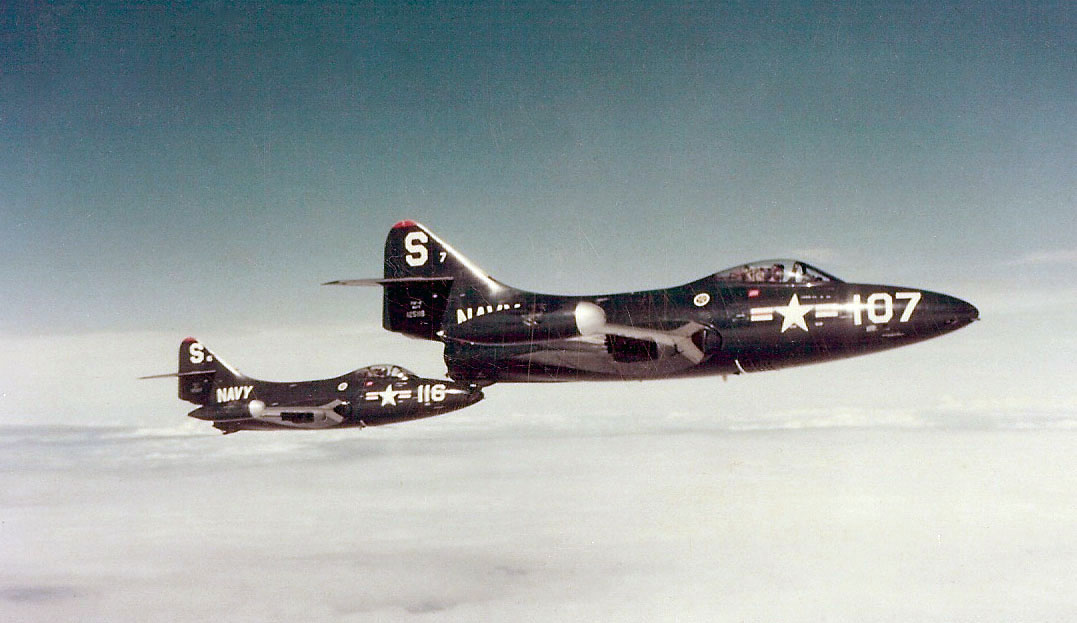
F9F-2 Panthers over Korea, with Armstrong piloting S-116 (left)

Armstrong flew the plane back to friendly territory, but because of the loss of the aileron, ejection was his only safe option. He intended to eject over water and await rescue by Navy helicopters, but his parachute was blown back over land. A jeep driven by a roommate from flight school picked him up; it is unknown what happened to the wreckage of his aircraft, F9F-2 BuNo 125122.

In all, Armstrong flew 78 missions over Korea for a total of 121 hours in the air, a third of them in January 1952, with the final mission on March 5, 1952. Of 492 U.S. Navy personnel killed in the Korean War, 27 of them were from Essex on this war cruise. Armstrong received the Air Medal for 20 combat missions, two gold stars for the next 40, the Korean Service Medal and Engagement Star, the National Defense Service Medal, and the United Nations Korea Medal.

Armstrong's regular commission was terminated on February 25, 1952, and he became an ensign in the United States Navy Reserve. On completion of his combat tour with Essex, he was assigned to a transport squadron, VR-32, in May 1952. He was released from active duty on August 23, 1952, but remained in the reserve, and was promoted to lieutenant (junior grade) on May 9, 1953. As a reservist, he continued to fly, first with VF-724 at Naval Air Station Glenview in Illinois, and then, after moving to California, with VF-773 at Naval Air Station Los Alamitos. He remained in the reserve for eight years before resigning his commission on October 21, 1960.

== College years ==
After his service with the Navy, Armstrong returned to Purdue. His grades improved after his return, lifting his final grade point average (GPA) to 4.8 out of 6.0. He pledged the Phi Delta Theta fraternity, and lived in its fraternity house. He wrote and co-directed two musicals as part of the all-student revue. The first was a version of Snow White and the Seven Dwarfs, co-directed with his girlfriend Joanne Alford from the Alpha Chi Omega sorority, with songs from the 1937 Walt Disney film, including "Someday My Prince Will Come"; the second was titled The Land of Egelloc ("college" spelled backward), with music from Gilbert and Sullivan but new lyrics.

Armstrong was chairman of the Purdue Aero Flying Club, and flew the club's aircraft, an Aeronca and a couple of Pipers, which were kept at nearby Aretz Airport in Lafayette, Indiana. Flying the Aeronca to Wapakoneta in 1954, he damaged it in a rough landing in a farmer's field, and it had to be hauled back to Lafayette on a trailer. He was a baritone player in the Purdue All-American Marching Band. Ten years later he was made an honorary member of Kappa Kappa Psi national band honorary fraternity. Armstrong graduated with a Bachelor of Science degree in Aeronautical Engineering in January 1955. In 1970, he completed his Master of Science degree in Aerospace Engineering at the University of Southern California (USC). He would eventually be awarded honorary doctorates by several universities.

Armstrong met Janet Elizabeth Shearon, who was majoring in home economics, at a party hosted by Alpha Chi Omega. According to the couple, there was no real courtship, and neither could remember the exact circumstances of their engagement. They were married on January 28, 1956, at the Congregational Church in Wilmette, Illinois. When he moved to Edwards Air Force Base, he lived in the bachelor quarters of the base, while Janet lived in the Westwood district of Los Angeles. After one semester, they moved into a house in Antelope Valley, near Edwards AFB. Janet did not finish her degree, a fact she regretted later in life. The couple had three children. In June 1961, their daughter Karen was diagnosed with diffuse intrinsic pontine glioma, a malignant tumor of the middle part of her brain stem. X-ray treatment slowed its growth, but her health deteriorated to the point where she could no longer walk or talk. She died of pneumonia, related to her weakened health, on January 28, 1962, aged two.

== Test pilot ==
Following his graduation from Purdue, Armstrong became an experimental research test pilot. He applied at the National Advisory Committee for Aeronautics (NACA) High-Speed Flight Station at Edwards Air Force Base. NACA had no open positions, and forwarded his application to the Lewis Flight Propulsion Laboratory in Cleveland, where Armstrong made his first test flight on March 1, 1955. Armstrong's stint at Cleveland lasted only a couple of months before a position at the High-Speed Flight Station became available, and he reported for work there on July 11, 1955.

Armstrong, 26, as a test pilot at the NACA High-Speed Flight Station at Edwards AFB, California

On his first day, Armstrong was tasked with piloting chase planes during releases of experimental aircraft from modified bombers. He also flew the modified bombers, and on one of these missions had his first flight incident at Edwards. On March 22, 1956, he was in a Boeing B-29 Superfortress, which was to air-drop a Douglas D-558-2 Skyrocket. He sat in the right-hand co-pilot seat while pilot in command, Stan Butchart, sat in the left-hand pilot seat flying the B-29.

As they climbed to 30,000 feet (9 km), the number-four engine stopped and the propeller began windmilling (rotating freely) in the airstream. Despite hitting the switch that would normally stop the propeller's spinning, Butchart watched it slow before speeding up again on its own accord even faster than the others; if it spun too fast, it would break apart. Their aircraft needed to hold an airspeed of 210 mph (338 km/h) to launch its Skyrocket payload, and the B-29 could not land with the Skyrocket attached to its belly. Armstrong and Butchart brought the aircraft into a nose-down attitude to increase speed, then launched the Skyrocket. At the instant of launch, the number-four engine propeller disintegrated. Pieces of it damaged the number-three engine and hit the number-two engine. Butchart and Armstrong were forced to shut down the damaged number-three engine, along with the number-one engine, because of the torque it created. They made a slow, circling descent from 30,000 ft (9 km) using only the number-two engine, and landed safely.

Armstrong served as project pilot on Century Series fighters, including the North American F-100 Super Sabre A and C variants, the McDonnell F-101 Voodoo, the Lockheed F-104 Starfighter, the Republic F-105 Thunderchief and the Convair F-106 Delta Dart. He also flew the Douglas DC-3, Lockheed T-33 Shooting Star, North American F-86 Sabre, McDonnell Douglas F-4 Phantom II, Douglas F5D-1 Skylancer, Boeing B-29 Superfortress, Boeing B-47 Stratojet and Boeing KC-135 Stratotanker, and was one of eight elite pilots involved in the Paresev paraglider research vehicle program. Over his career, he flew more than 200 different models of aircraft. His first flight in a rocket-powered aircraft was on August 15, 1957, in the Bell X-1B, to an altitude of 11.4 miles (18.3 km). On landing, the poorly designed nose landing gear failed, as had happened on about a dozen previous flights of the Bell X-1B. He flew the North American X-15 seven times, including the first flight with the Q-ball system, the first flight of the number 3 X-15 airframe, and the first flight of the MH-96 adaptive flight control system. He became an employee of the National Aeronautics and Space Administration (NASA) when it was established on October 1, 1958, absorbing NACA.

Armstrong was involved in several incidents that went down in Edwards folklore or were chronicled in the memoirs of colleagues. During his sixth X-15 flight on April 20, 1962, Armstrong was testing the MH-96 control system when he flew to a height of over 207,000 feet (63 km)—the highest he flew before Gemini 8. He held up the aircraft nose during its descent to demonstrate the MH-96's g-limiting performance, and the X-15 ballooned back up to around 140,000 feet (43 km). He flew past the landing field at Mach 3 at over 100,000 feet (30 km) in altitude, and ended up 40 miles (64 km) south of Edwards. After sufficient descent, he turned back toward the landing area, and landed. It was the longest X-15 flight in both flight time and length of the ground track.

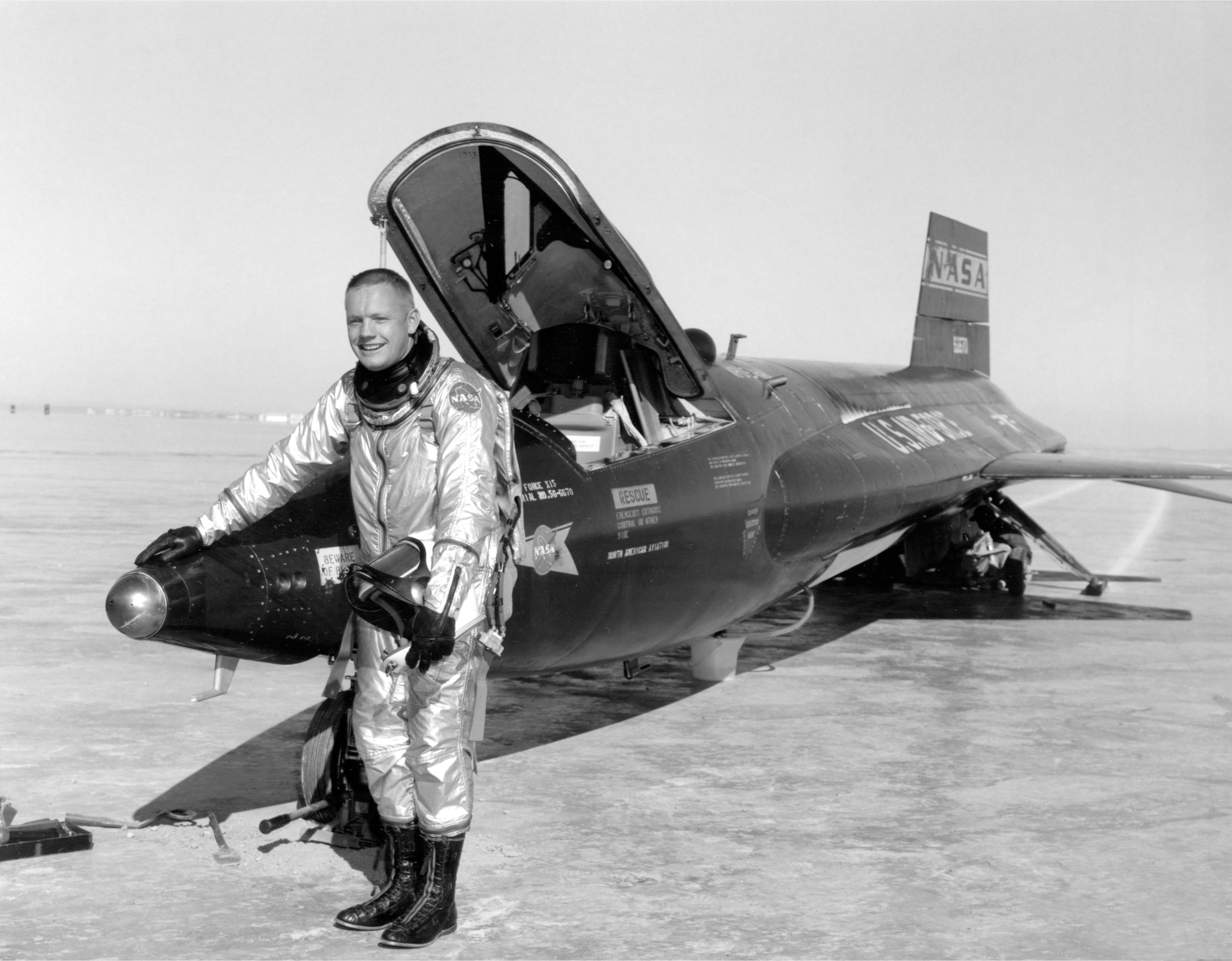
Armstrong and X-15-1 after a research flight in 1960

Fellow astronaut Michael Collins wrote that of the X-15 pilots Armstrong "had been considered one of the weaker stick-and-rudder men, but the very best when it came to understanding the machine's design and how it operated". Many of the test pilots at Edwards praised Armstrong's engineering ability. Milt Thompson said he was "the most technically capable of the early X-15 pilots". Bill Dana said Armstrong "had a mind that absorbed things like a sponge". Those who flew for the Air Force tended to have a different opinion, especially people like Chuck Yeager and Pete Knight, who did not have engineering degrees. Knight said that pilot-engineers flew in a way that was "more mechanical than it is flying", and gave this as the reason why some pilot-engineers got into trouble: Their flying skills did not come naturally. Armstrong made seven flights in the X-15 between November 30, 1960, and July 26, 1962. He reached a top speed of Mach 5.74 (3,989 mph, 6,420 km/h) in the X-15-1, and left the Flight Research Center with a total of 2,400 flying hours.

On April 24, 1962, Armstrong flew for the only time with Yeager. Their job, flying a T-33, was to evaluate Smith Ranch Dry Lake in Nevada for use as an emergency landing site for the X-15. In his autobiography, Yeager wrote that he knew the lake bed was unsuitable for landings after recent rains, but Armstrong insisted on flying out anyway. As they attempted a touch-and-go, the wheels became stuck and they had to wait for rescue. As Armstrong told the story, Yeager never tried to talk him out of it and they made a first successful landing on the east side of the lake. Then Yeager told him to try again, this time a bit slower. On the second landing, they became stuck, provoking Yeager to fits of laughter.

On May 21, 1962, Armstrong was involved in the "Nellis Affair". He was sent in an F-104 to inspect Delamar Dry Lake in southern Nevada, again for emergency landings. He misjudged his altitude and did not realize that the landing gear had not fully extended. As he touched down, the landing gear began to retract; Armstrong applied full power to abort the landing, but the ventral fin and landing gear door struck the ground, damaging the radio and releasing hydraulic fluid. Without radio communication, Armstrong flew south to Nellis Air Force Base, past the control tower, and waggled his wings, the signal for a no-radio approach. The loss of hydraulic fluid caused the tailhook to release, and upon landing, he caught the arresting wire attached to an anchor chain, and dragged the chain along the runway.

It took thirty minutes to clear the runway and rig another arresting cable. Armstrong telephoned Edwards and asked for someone to collect him. Milt Thompson was sent in an F-104B, the only two-seater available, but a plane Thompson had never flown. With great difficulty, Thompson made it to Nellis, where a strong crosswind caused a hard landing and the left main tire suffered a blowout. The runway was again closed to clear it, and Bill Dana was sent to Nellis in a T-33, but he almost landed long. The Nellis base operations office then decided that to avoid any further problems, it would be best to find the three NASA pilots ground transport back to Edwards.

== Astronaut career ==
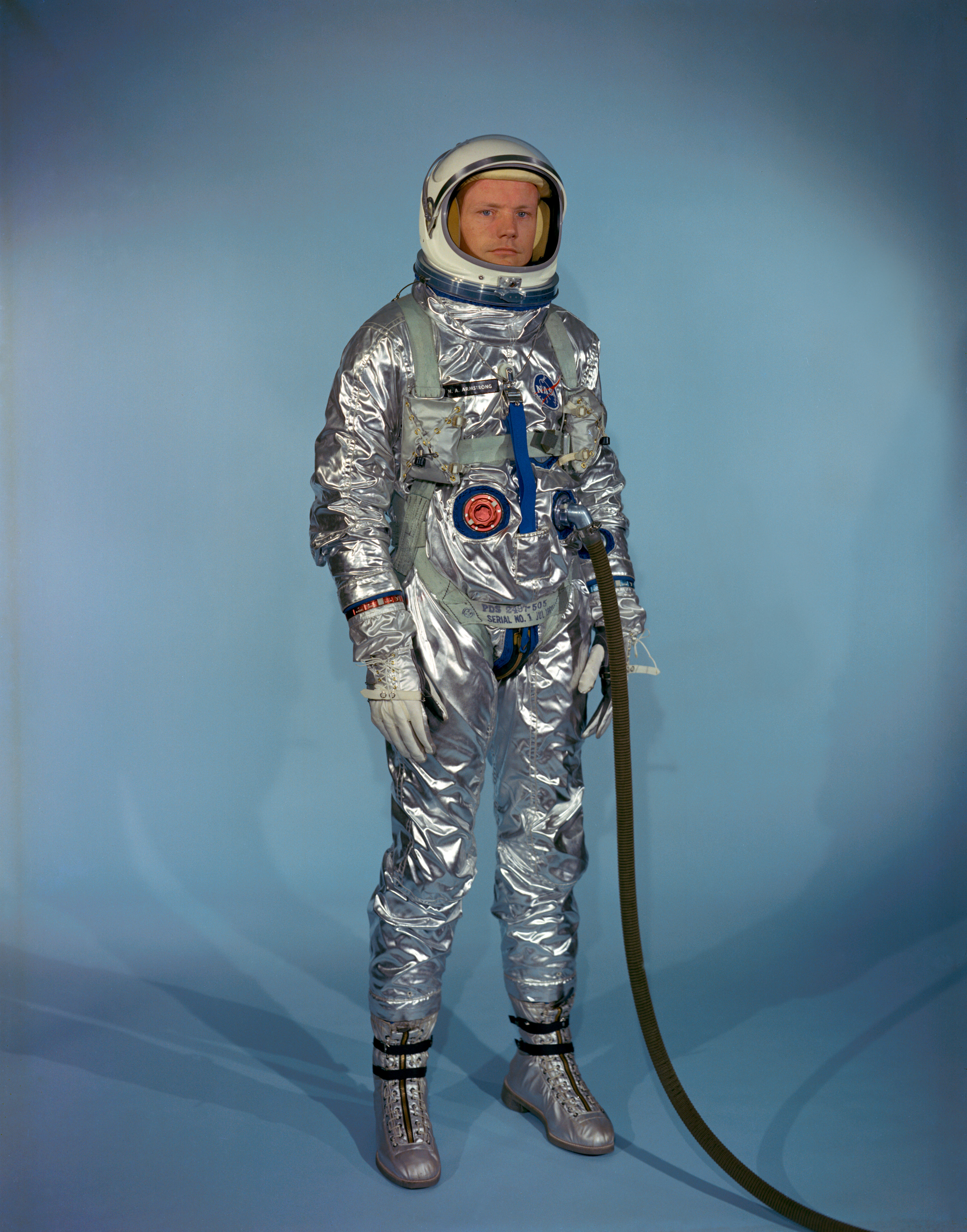
Armstrong in an early Gemini space suit

In June 1958, Armstrong was selected for the U.S. Air Force's Man in Space Soonest program, but the Advanced Research Projects Agency (ARPA) canceled its funding on August 1, 1958, and on November 5, 1958, it was superseded by Project Mercury, a civilian project run by NASA. As a NASA civilian test pilot, Armstrong was ineligible to become one of its astronauts at this time, as selection was restricted to military test pilots. In November 1960, he was chosen as part of the pilot consultant group for the X-20 Dyna-Soar, a military space plane under development by Boeing for the U.S. Air Force, and on March 15, 1962, he was selected by the U.S. Air Force as one of seven pilot-engineers who would fly the X-20 when it got off the design board.

In April 1962, NASA sought applications for the second group of NASA astronauts for Project Gemini, a proposed two-man spacecraft. This time, selection was open to qualified civilian test pilots. Armstrong visited the Seattle World's Fair in May 1962 and attended a conference there on space exploration that was co-sponsored by NASA. After he returned from Seattle on June 4, he applied to become an astronaut. His application arrived about a week past the June 1, 1962, deadline, but Dick Day, a flight simulator expert with whom Armstrong had worked closely at Edwards, saw the late arrival of the application and slipped it into the pile before anyone noticed. At Brooks Air Force Base at the end of June, Armstrong underwent a medical exam that many of the applicants described as painful and at times seemingly pointless.

NASA's Director of Flight Crew Operations, Deke Slayton, called Armstrong on September 13, 1962, and asked whether he would be interested in joining the NASA Astronaut Corps as part of what the press dubbed "the New Nine"; without hesitation, Armstrong said yes. The selections were kept secret until three days later, although newspaper reports had circulated since earlier that year that he would be selected as the "first civilian astronaut". Armstrong was one of two civilian pilots selected for this group; the other was Elliot See, another former naval aviator. NASA selected the second group that, compared with the Mercury Seven astronauts, were younger, and had more impressive academic credentials. Collins wrote that Armstrong was by far the most experienced test pilot in the Astronaut Corps.

=== Gemini program ===
==== Gemini 5 ====
On February 8, 1965, Armstrong and Elliot See were picked as the backup crew for Gemini 5, with Armstrong as commander, supporting the prime crew of Gordon Cooper and Pete Conrad. The mission's purpose was to practice space rendezvous and to develop procedures and equipment for a seven-day flight, all of which would be required for a mission to the Moon. With two other flights (Gemini 3 and Gemini 4) in preparation, six crews were competing for simulator time, so Gemini 5 was postponed. It finally lifted off on August 21. Armstrong and See watched the launch at Cape Kennedy, then flew to the Manned Spacecraft Center (MSC) in Houston. The mission was generally successful, despite a problem with the fuel cells that prevented a rendezvous. Cooper and Conrad practiced a "phantom rendezvous", carrying out the maneuver without a target.

==== Gemini 8 ====
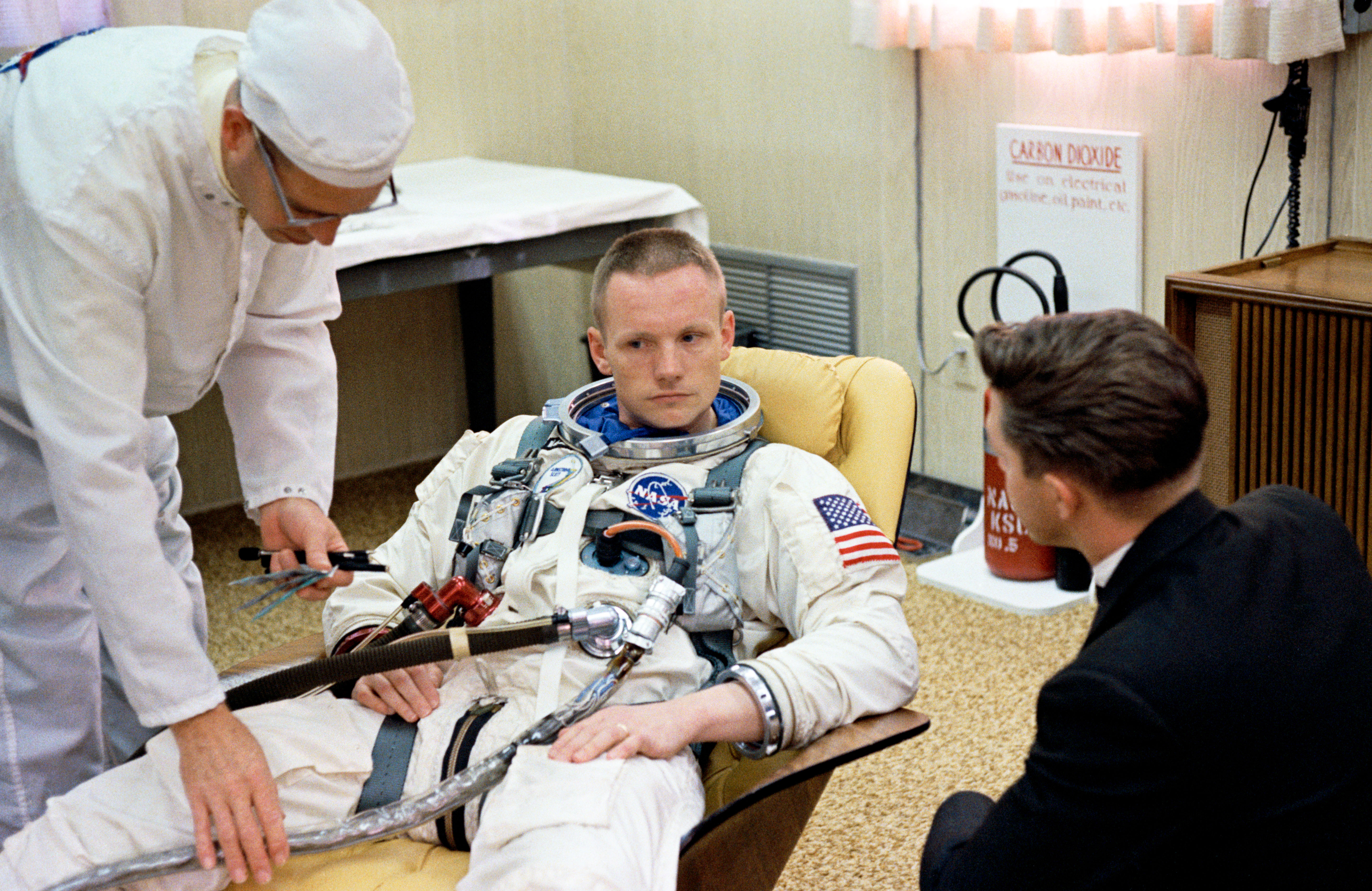
Armstrong, 35, suiting up for Gemini 8 in March 1966

The crews for Gemini 8 were assigned on September 20, 1965. Under the normal rotation system, the backup crew for one mission became the prime crew for the third mission after, but Slayton designated David Scott as the pilot of Gemini 8. Scott was the first member of the third group of astronauts, who was selected on October 18, 1963, to receive a prime crew assignment. See was designated to command Gemini 9. Henceforth, each Gemini mission was commanded by a member of Armstrong's group, with a member of Scott's group as the pilot. Conrad would be Armstrong's backup this time, and Richard F. Gordon Jr. his pilot. Armstrong became the first American civilian in space. (Valentina Tereshkova of the Soviet Union had become the first civilian—and first woman—nearly three years earlier aboard Vostok 6 when it launched on June 16, 1963.) Armstrong would also be the last of his group to fly in space, as See died in a T-38 crash on February 28, 1966, that also took the life of crewmate Charles Bassett. They were replaced by the backup crew of Tom Stafford and Gene Cernan, while Jim Lovell and Buzz Aldrin moved up from the backup crew of Gemini 10 to become the backup for Gemini 9, and would eventually fly Gemini 12.

Gemini 8 launched on March 16, 1966. It was the most complex mission yet, with a rendezvous and docking with an uncrewed Agena target vehicle, and the planned second American spacewalk (EVA) by Scott. The mission was planned to last 75 hours and 55 orbits. After the Agena lifted off at 10:00:00 EST, the Titan II rocket carrying Armstrong and Scott ignited at 11:41:02 EST, putting them into an orbit from which they chased the Agena. They achieved the first-ever docking between two spacecraft. Contact with the crew was intermittent due to the lack of tracking stations covering their entire orbits. While out of contact with the ground, the docked spacecraft began to roll, and Armstrong attempted to correct this with the Gemini's Orbit Attitude and Maneuvering System (OAMS). Following the earlier advice of Mission Control, they undocked, but the roll increased dramatically until they were turning about once per second, indicating a problem with Gemini's attitude control. Armstrong engaged the Reentry Control System (RCS) and turned off the OAMS. Mission rules dictated that once this system was turned on, the spacecraft had to reenter at the next possible opportunity. It was later thought that damaged wiring caused one of the thrusters to stick in the on position.

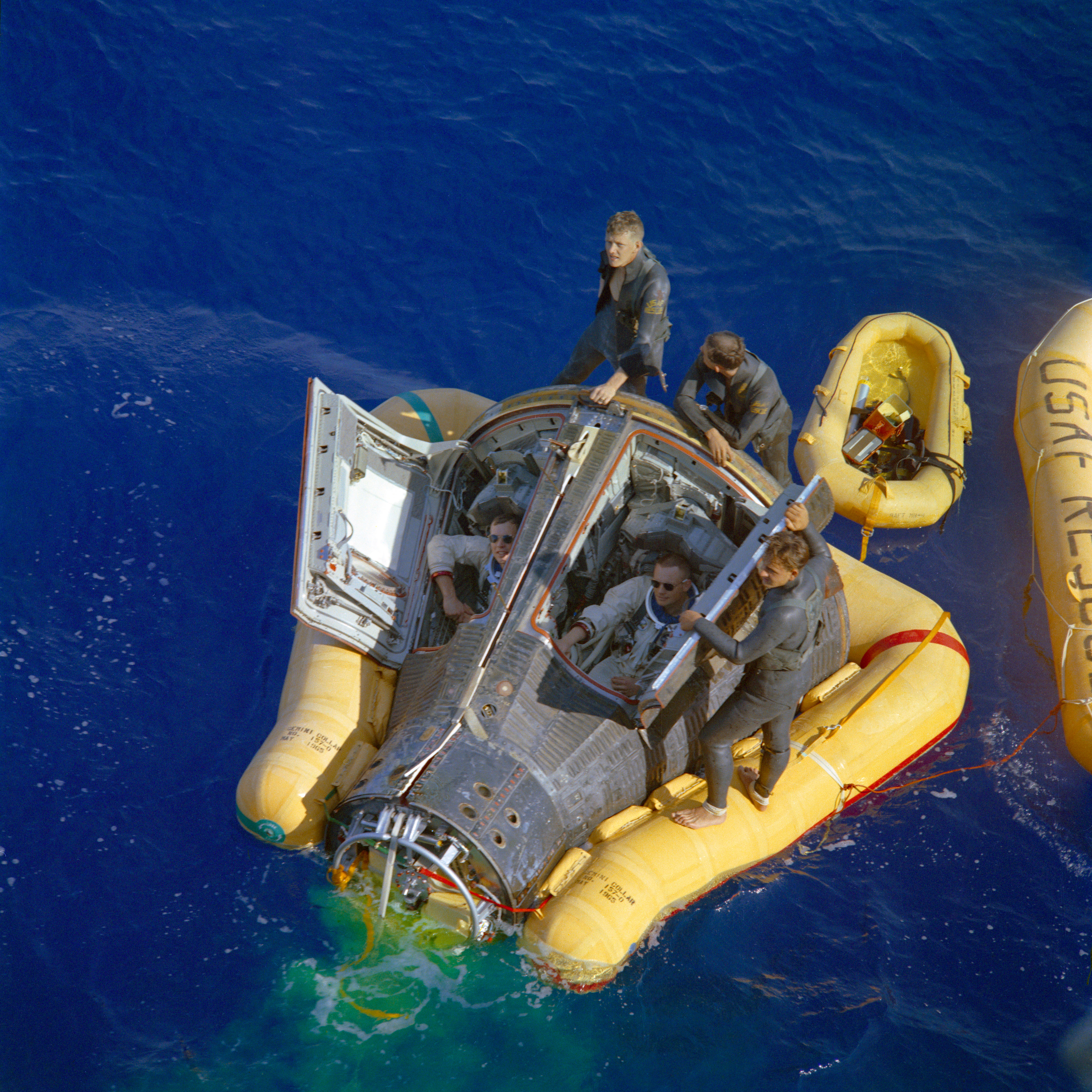
Recovery of Gemini 8 from the western Pacific Ocean; Armstrong sitting to the right

A few people in the Astronaut Office, including Walter Cunningham, felt that Armstrong and Scott "had botched their first mission". There was speculation that Armstrong could have salvaged the mission if he had turned on only one of the two RCS rings, saving the other for mission objectives. These criticisms were unfounded; no malfunction procedures had been written, and it was possible to turn on only both RCS rings, not one or the other. Gene Kranz wrote, "The crew reacted as they were trained, and they reacted wrong because we trained them wrong." The mission planners and controllers had failed to realize that when two spacecraft were docked, they must be considered one spacecraft. Kranz considered this the mission's most important lesson. Armstrong was depressed that the mission was cut short, canceling most mission objectives and robbing Scott of his EVA. The Agena was later reused as a docking target by Gemini 10. Armstrong and Scott received the NASA Exceptional Service Medal, and the Air Force awarded Scott the Distinguished Flying Cross as well. Scott was promoted to lieutenant colonel, and Armstrong received a $678 raise in pay to $21,653 a year (equivalent to $214,864 in 2025), making him NASA's highest-paid astronaut.

==== Gemini 11 ====
In Armstrong's final assignment in the Gemini program, he was the back-up Command Pilot for Gemini 11. Having trained for two flights, Armstrong was quite knowledgeable about the systems and took on a teaching role for the rookie backup pilot, William Anders. The launch was on September 12, 1966, with Conrad and Gordon on board, who successfully completed the mission objectives, while Armstrong served as a capsule communicator (CAPCOM).

Following the flight, President Lyndon B. Johnson asked Armstrong and his wife to take part in a 24-day goodwill tour of South America. Also on the tour, which took in 11 countries and 14 major cities, were Dick Gordon, George Low, their wives, and other government officials. In Paraguay, Armstrong greeted dignitaries in their local language, Guarani; in Brazil he talked about the exploits of the Brazilian-born aviation pioneer Alberto Santos-Dumont.

=== Apollo program ===
On January 27, 1967—the day of the Apollo 1 fire—Armstrong was in Washington, D.C., with Cooper, Gordon, Lovell and Scott Carpenter for the signing of the United Nations Outer Space Treaty. The astronauts chatted with the assembled dignitaries until 18:45, when Carpenter went to the airport, and the others returned to the Georgetown Inn, where they each found messages to phone the MSC. During these calls, they learned of the deaths of Gus Grissom, Ed White and Roger Chaffee in the fire. Armstrong and the group spent the rest of the night drinking scotch and discussing what had happened.

On April 5, 1967, the same day the Apollo 1 investigation released its final report, Armstrong and 17 other astronauts gathered for a meeting with Slayton. The first thing Slayton said was, "The guys who are going to fly the first lunar missions are the guys in this room." According to Cernan, only Armstrong showed no reaction to the statement. To Armstrong it came as no surprise—the room was full of veterans of Project Gemini, the only people who could fly the lunar missions. Slayton talked about the planned missions and named Armstrong to the backup crew for Apollo 9, which at that stage was planned as a medium Earth orbit test of the combined lunar module and command and service module.

The crew was officially assigned on November 20, 1967. For crewmates, Armstrong was assigned Lovell and Aldrin, from Gemini 12. After design and manufacturing delays of the lunar module (LM), Apollo 8 and 9 swapped prime and backup crews. Based on the normal crew rotation, Armstrong would command Apollo 11, with one change: Collins on the Apollo 8 crew began experiencing trouble with his legs. Doctors diagnosed the problem as a bony growth between his fifth and sixth vertebrae, requiring surgery. Lovell took his place on the Apollo 8 crew, and, when Collins recovered, he joined Armstrong's crew.

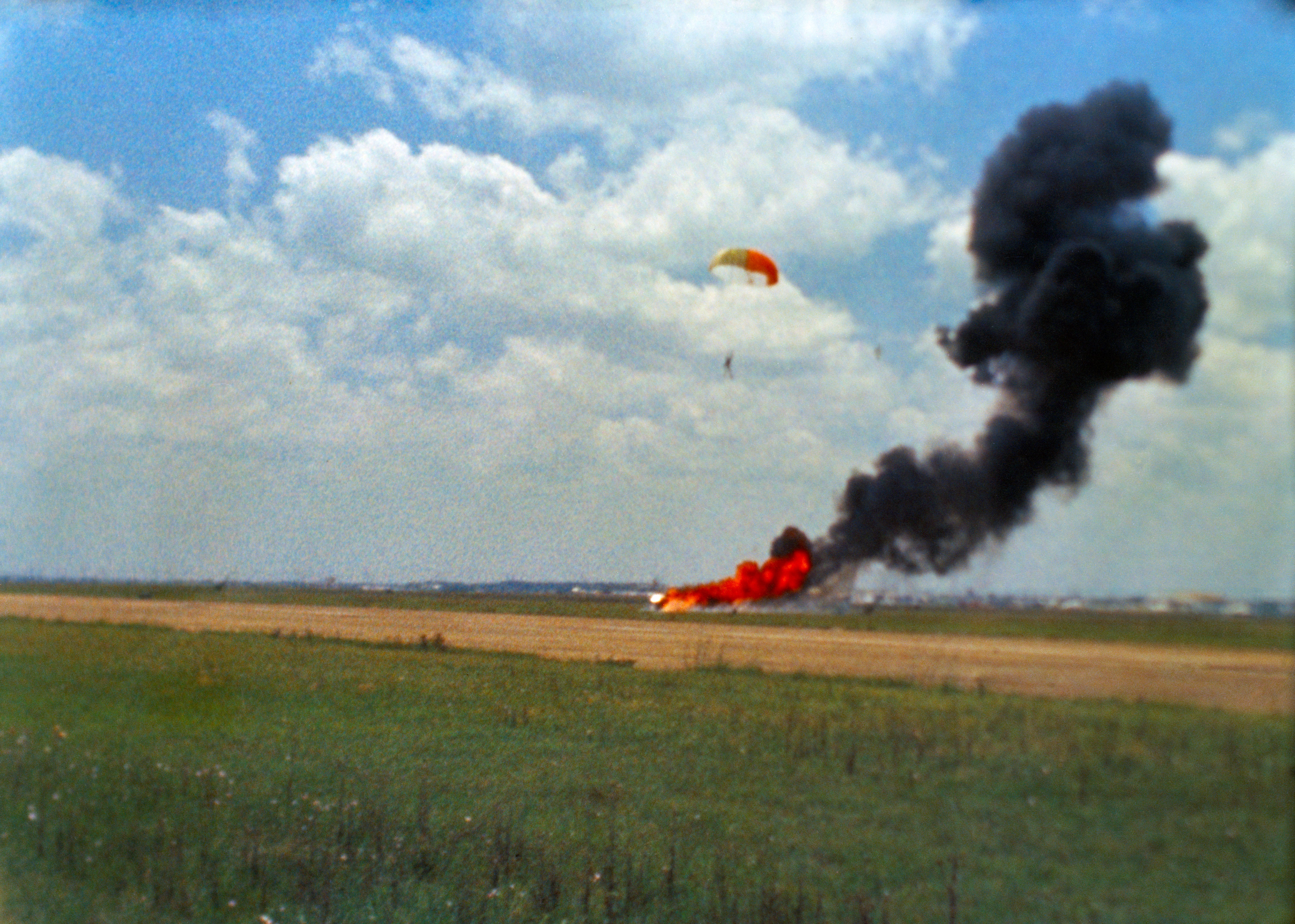
Armstrong descends to the ground on a parachute after ejecting from Lunar Landing Research Vehicle 1.

To give the astronauts practice piloting the LM on its descent, NASA commissioned Bell Aircraft to build two Lunar Landing Research Vehicles (LLRV), later augmented with three Lunar Landing Training Vehicles (LLTV). Nicknamed the "Flying Bedsteads", they simulated the Moon's one-sixth gravity using a turbofan engine to support five-sixths of the craft's weight. On May 6, 1968, 100 feet (30 m) above the ground, Armstrong's controls started to degrade and the LLRV began rolling. He ejected safely before the vehicle struck the ground and burst into flames. Later analysis suggested that if he had ejected half a second later, his parachute would not have opened in time. His only injury was from biting his tongue. The LLRV was completely destroyed. Even though he was nearly killed, Armstrong maintained that without the LLRV and LLTV, the lunar landings would not have been successful, as they gave commanders essential experience in piloting the lunar landing craft.

In addition to the LLRV training, NASA began lunar landing simulator training after Apollo 10 was completed. Aldrin and Armstrong trained for a variety of scenarios that could develop during a real lunar landing. They also received briefings from geologists at NASA.

==== Apollo 11 ====
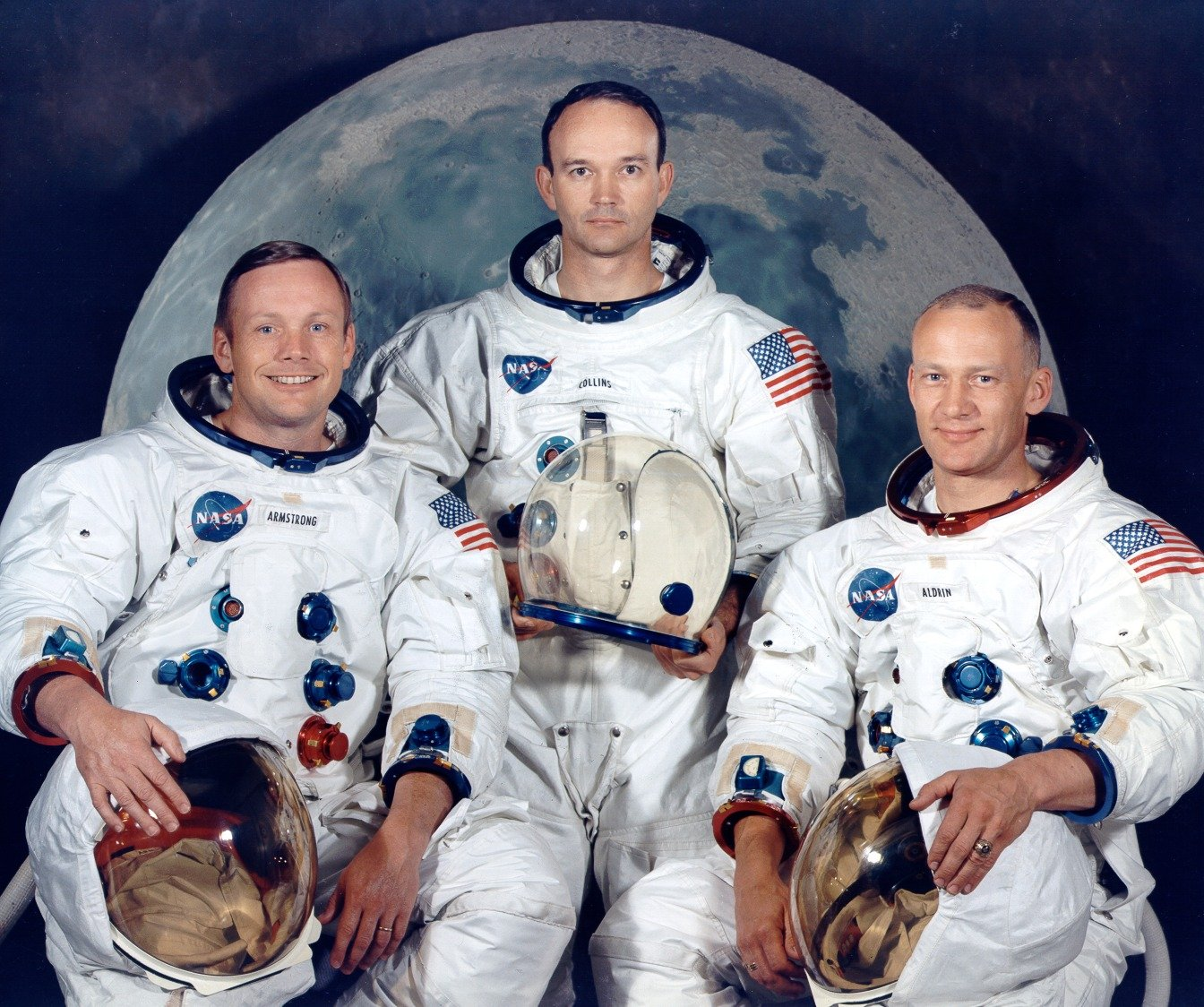
The Apollo 11 crew: Armstrong, Michael Collins, and Buzz Aldrin.

After Armstrong served as backup commander for Apollo 8, Slayton offered him the post of commander of Apollo 11 on December 23, 1968, as Apollo 8 orbited the Moon. According to Armstrong's 2005 biography, Slayton told him that although the planned crew was Commander Armstrong, Lunar Module Pilot Buzz Aldrin, and Command Module Pilot Michael Collins, he was offering Armstrong the chance to replace Aldrin with Jim Lovell. After thinking it over for a day, Armstrong told Slayton he would stick with Aldrin, as he had no difficulty working with him and thought Lovell deserved his own command. Replacing Aldrin with Lovell would have made Lovell the lunar module pilot, unofficially the lowest ranked member, and Armstrong could not justify placing Lovell, the commander of Gemini 12, in the number 3 position of the crew. The crew of Apollo 11 was assigned on January 9, 1969, as Armstrong, Collins, and Aldrin, with Lovell, Anders, and Fred Haise as the backup crew.

According to Chris Kraft, a March 1969 meeting among Slayton, George Low, Bob Gilruth, and Kraft determined that Armstrong would be the first person on the Moon, in part because NASA management saw him as a person who did not have a large ego. A press conference on April 14, 1969, gave the design of the LM cabin as the reason for Armstrong's being first; the hatch opened inwards and to the right, making it difficult for the LM pilot, on the right-hand side, to exit first. At the time of their meeting, the four men did not know about the hatch consideration. The first knowledge of the meeting outside the small group came when Kraft wrote his book. Methods of circumventing this difficulty existed, but it is not known if these were considered at the time. Slayton added, "Secondly, just on a pure protocol basis, I figured the commander ought to be the first guy out ... I changed it as soon as I found they had the time line that showed that. Bob Gilruth approved my decision."

==== Voyage to the Moon ====
A Saturn V rocket launched Apollo 11 from Launch Complex 39A at the Kennedy Space Center on July 16, 1969, at 13:32:00 UTC (09:32:00 EDT local time). Armstrong's wife Janet and two sons watched from a yacht moored on the Banana River. During the launch, Armstrong's heart rate peaked at 110 beats per minute. He found the first stage the loudest, much noisier than the Gemini 8 Titan II launch. The Apollo command module was relatively roomy compared with the Gemini spacecraft. None of the Apollo 11 crew suffered space sickness, as some members of previous crews had. Armstrong was especially glad about this, as he had been prone to motion sickness as a child and could experience nausea after long periods of aerobatics.

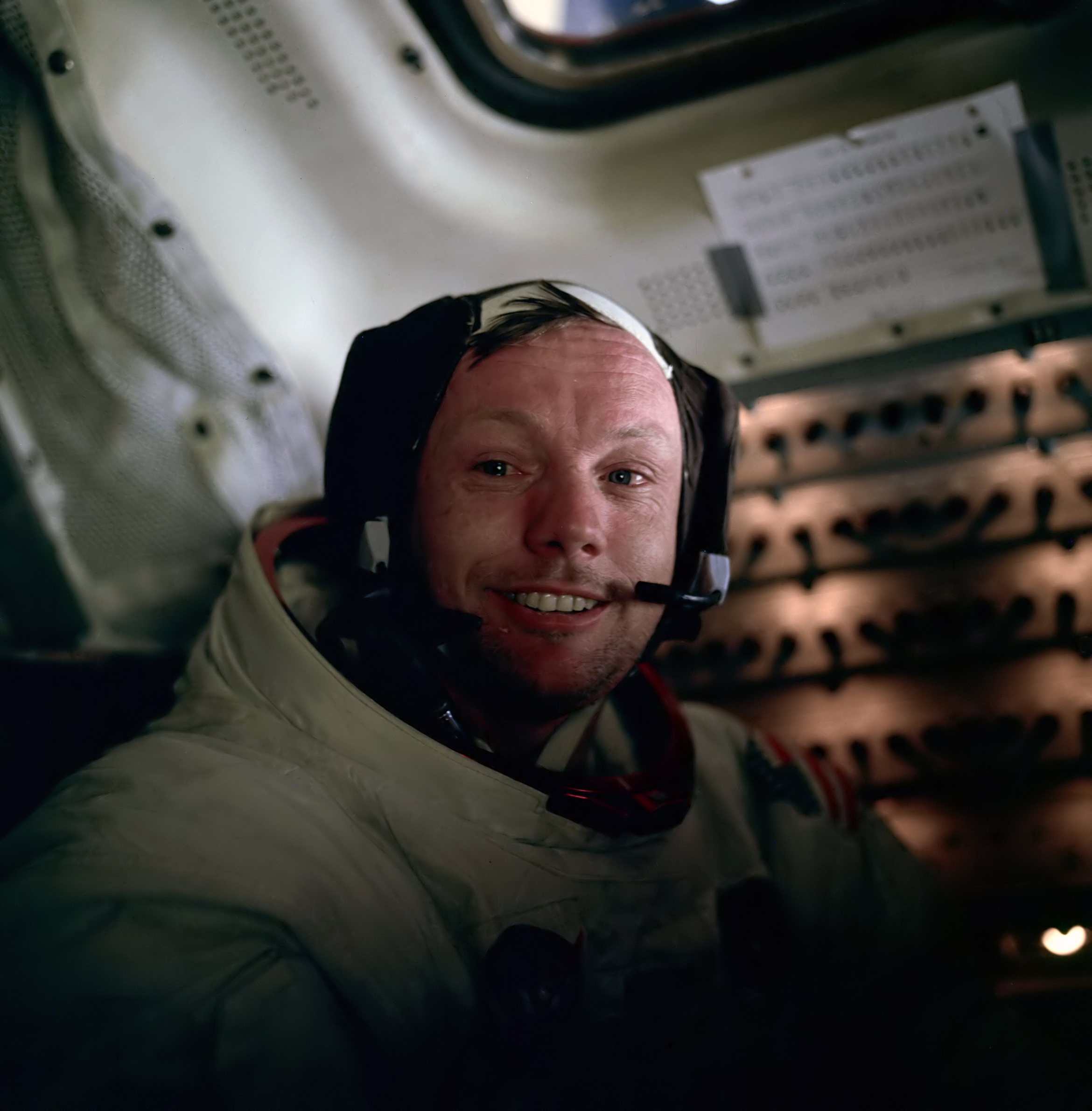
Armstrong in the lunar module after the completion of the EVA

Apollo 11's objective was to land safely on the Moon, rather than to touch down at a precise location. Three minutes into the lunar descent, Armstrong noted that craters were passing about two seconds too early, which meant the Lunar Module Eagle would probably touch down several miles (kilometres) beyond the planned landing zone. As the Eagle's landing radar acquired the surface, several computer error alarms sounded. The first was a code 1202 alarm, and even with their extensive training, neither Armstrong nor Aldrin knew what this code meant. They promptly received word from CAPCOM Charles Duke in Houston that the alarms were not a concern; the 1202 and 1201 alarms were caused by executive overflows in the lunar module guidance computer. In 2007, Aldrin said the overflows were caused by his own counter-checklist choice of leaving the docking radar on during the landing process, causing the computer to process unnecessary radar data. When it did not have enough time to execute all tasks, the computer dropped the lower-priority ones, triggering the alarms. Aldrin said he decided to leave the radar on in case an abort was necessary when re-docking with the Apollo command module; he did not realize it would cause the processing overflows.

Armstrong lands the Lunar Module Eagle on the Moon, July 20, 1969.

When Armstrong noticed they were heading toward a landing area that seemed unsafe, he took manual control of the LM and attempted to find a safer area. This took longer than expected, and longer than most simulations had taken. For this reason, Mission Control was concerned that the LM was running low on fuel. On landing, Aldrin and Armstrong believed they had 40 seconds of fuel left, including the 20 seconds' worth which had to be saved in the event of an abort. During training, Armstrong had, on several occasions, landed with fewer than 15 seconds of fuel; he was also confident the LM could survive a fall of up to 50 feet (15 m). Post-mission analysis showed that at touchdown there were 45 to 50 seconds of propellant burn time left.

The landing on the surface of the Moon occurred several seconds after 20:17:40 UTC on July 20, 1969. One of three 67-inch (170 cm) probes attached to three of the LM's four legs made contact with the surface, a panel light in the LM illuminated, and Aldrin called out, "Contact light." Armstrong shut the engine off and said, "Shutdown." As the LM settled onto the surface, Aldrin said, "Okay, engine stop"; then they both called out some post-landing checklist items. After a 10-second pause, Duke acknowledged the landing with, "We copy you down, Eagle." Armstrong confirmed the landing to Mission Control and the world with the words, "Houston, Tranquility Base here. The Eagle has landed." Aldrin and Armstrong celebrated with a brisk handshake and pat on the back. They then returned to the checklist of contingency tasks, should an emergency liftoff become necessary. After Armstrong confirmed touch down, Duke re-acknowledged, adding a comment about the flight crew's relief: "Roger, Tranquility. We copy you on the ground. You got a bunch of guys about to turn blue. We're breathing again. Thanks a lot." During the landing, Armstrong's heart rate ranged from 100 to 150 beats per minute.

==== First Moon walk ====
Armstrong describes the lunar surface.

The flight plan called for a crew rest period before leaving the module, but Armstrong asked for this to be moved to earlier in the evening, Houston time. When he and Aldrin were ready to go outside, Eagle was depressurized, the hatch was opened, and Armstrong made his way down the ladder. At the bottom of the ladder, while standing on a Lunar Module landing pad, Armstrong said, "I'm going to step off the LM now". He turned and set his left boot on the lunar surface at 02:56 UTC July 21, 1969, then said, "That's one small step for [a] man, one giant leap for mankind." The exact time of Armstrong's first step on the Moon is unclear.

Armstrong prepared his famous epigram on his own. In a post-flight press conference, he said that he chose the words "just prior to leaving the LM." In a 1983 interview in Esquire magazine, he explained to George Plimpton: "I always knew there was a good chance of being able to return to Earth, but I thought the chances of a successful touch down on the moon surface were about even money—fifty–fifty ... Most people don't realize how difficult the mission was. So it didn't seem to me there was much point in thinking of something to say if we'd have to abort landing." In 2012, his brother Dean Armstrong said that Neil showed him a draft of the line months before the launch. Historian Andrew Chaikin, who interviewed Armstrong in 1988 for his book A Man on the Moon, disputed that Armstrong claimed to have conceived the line during the mission.

Recordings of Armstrong's transmission do not provide evidence for the indefinite article "a" before "man", though NASA and Armstrong insisted for years that static obscured it. Armstrong stated he would never make such a mistake, but after repeated listenings to recordings, he eventually conceded he must have dropped the "a". He later said he "would hope that history would grant me leeway for dropping the syllable and understand that it was certainly intended, even if it was not said—although it might actually have been". There have since been claims and counter-claims about whether acoustic analysis of the recording reveals the presence of the missing "a"; Peter Shann Ford, an Australian computer programmer, conducted a digital audio analysis and claims that Armstrong did say "a man", but the "a" was inaudible due to the limitations of communications technology of the time. Ford and James R. Hansen, Armstrong's authorized biographer, presented these findings to Armstrong and NASA representatives, who conducted their own analysis. Armstrong found Ford's analysis "persuasive". Linguists David Beaver and Mark Liberman wrote of their skepticism of Ford's claims on the blog Language Log. A 2016 peer-reviewed study again concluded Armstrong had included the article. NASA's transcript continues to show the "a" in parentheses.

When Armstrong made his proclamation, Voice of America was rebroadcast live by the BBC and many other stations worldwide. An estimated 530 million people viewed the event, 20 percent out of a world population of approximately 3.6 billion.

Q: Did you misspeak?

A: There isn't any way of knowing.

Q: Several sources say you did.

A: I mean, there isn't any way of my knowing. When I listen to the tape, I can't hear the 'a', but that doesn't mean it wasn't there, because that was the fastest VOX ever built. There was no mike-switch—it was a voice-operated key or VOX. In a helmet you find you lose a lot of syllables. Sometimes a short syllable like 'a' might not be transmitted. However, when I listen to it, I can't hear it. But the 'a' is implied, so I'm happy if they just put it in parentheses.

— Omni, June 1982, p. 126

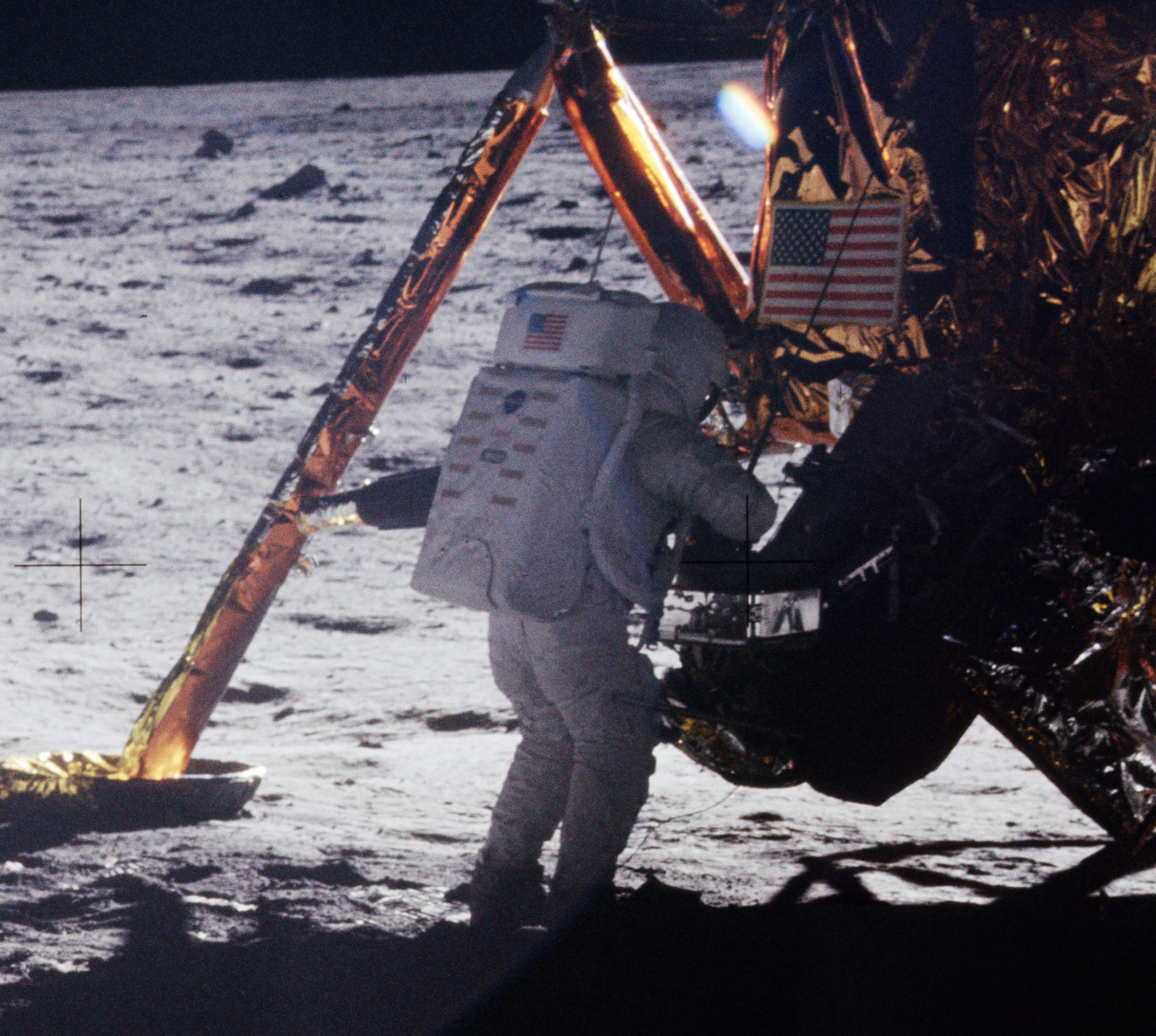
Armstrong on the Moon

About 19 minutes after Armstrong's first step, Aldrin joined him on the surface, becoming the second human to walk on the Moon. They began their tasks of investigating how easily a person could operate on the lunar surface. Armstrong unveiled a plaque commemorating the flight, and with Aldrin, planted the flag of the United States. Although Armstrong had wanted the flag to be draped on the flagpole, it was decided to use a metal rod to hold it horizontally. However, the rod did not fully extend, leaving the flag with a slightly wavy appearance, as if there were a breeze. Shortly after the flag planting, President Richard Nixon spoke to them by telephone from his office. He spoke for about a minute, after which Armstrong responded for about thirty seconds. In the Apollo 11 photographic record, there are only five images of Armstrong partly shown or reflected. The mission was planned to the minute, with the majority of photographic tasks performed by Armstrong with the single Hasselblad camera.

After helping to set up the Early Apollo Scientific Experiment Package, Armstrong went for a walk to what is now known as East Crater, 65 yards (59 m) east of the LM, the greatest distance traveled from the LM on the mission. His final task was to remind Aldrin to leave a small package of memorial items to Soviet cosmonauts Yuri Gagarin and Vladimir Komarov, and Apollo 1 astronauts Grissom, White and Chaffee. The Apollo 11 EVA lasted two and a half hours. Each of the subsequent five landings was allotted a progressively longer EVA period; the crew of Apollo 17 spent over 22 hours exploring the lunar surface. In a 2010 interview, Armstrong explained that NASA limited their Moon walk because they were unsure how the space suits would cope with the Moon's extremely high temperature.

==== Return to Earth ====
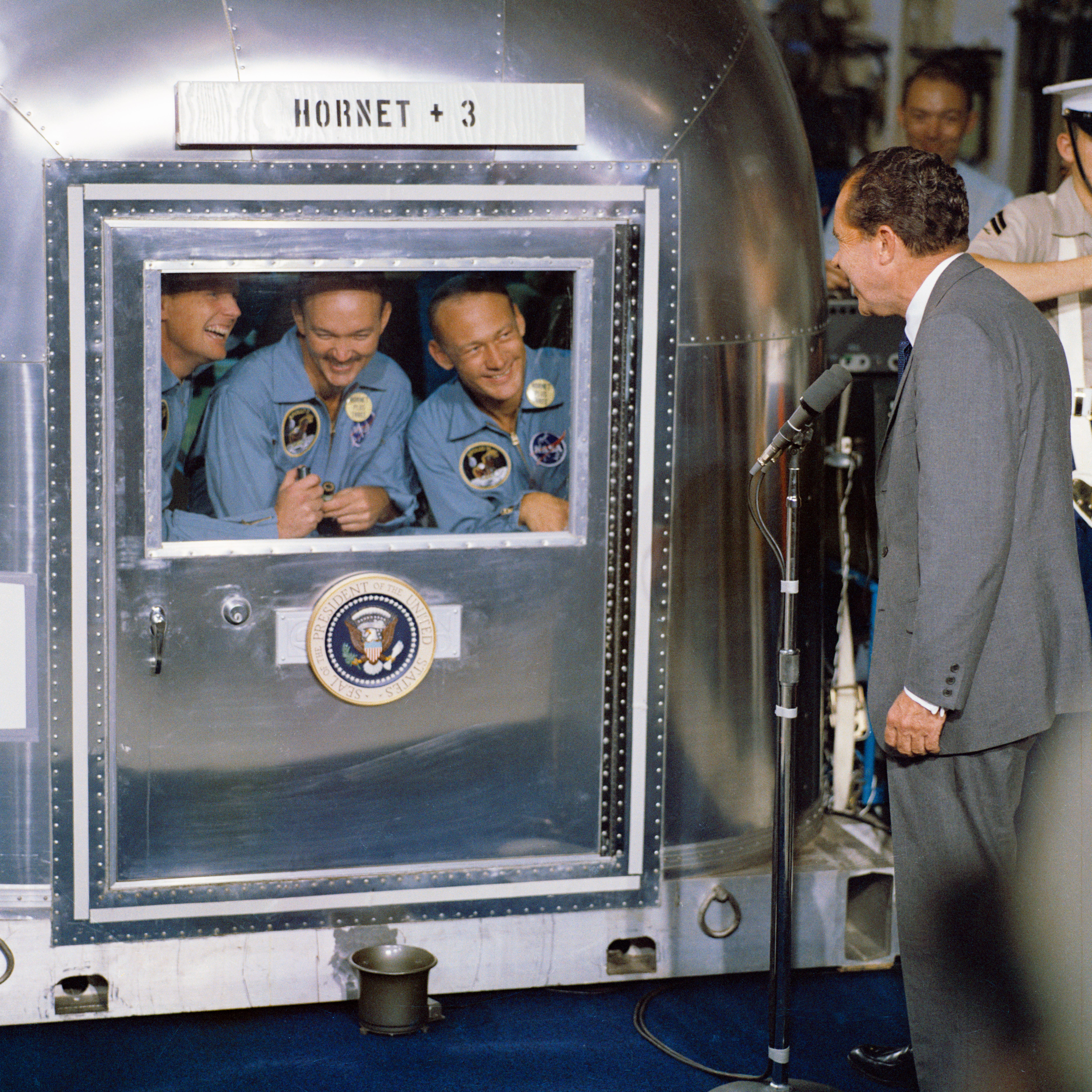
The Apollo 11 crew and President Richard Nixon during the post-mission quarantine period

After they re-entered the LM, the hatch was closed and sealed. While preparing for liftoff, Armstrong and Aldrin discovered that, in their bulky space suits, they had broken the ignition switch for the ascent engine; using part of a pen, they pushed in the circuit breaker to start the launch sequence. The Eagle then continued to its rendezvous in lunar orbit, where it docked with Columbia, the command and service module. The three astronauts returned to Earth and splashed down in the Pacific Ocean, to be picked up by the USS Hornet.

After being released from an 18-day quarantine to ensure that they had not picked up any infections or diseases from the Moon, the crew was feted across the United States and around the world as part of a 38-day "Giant Leap" tour.

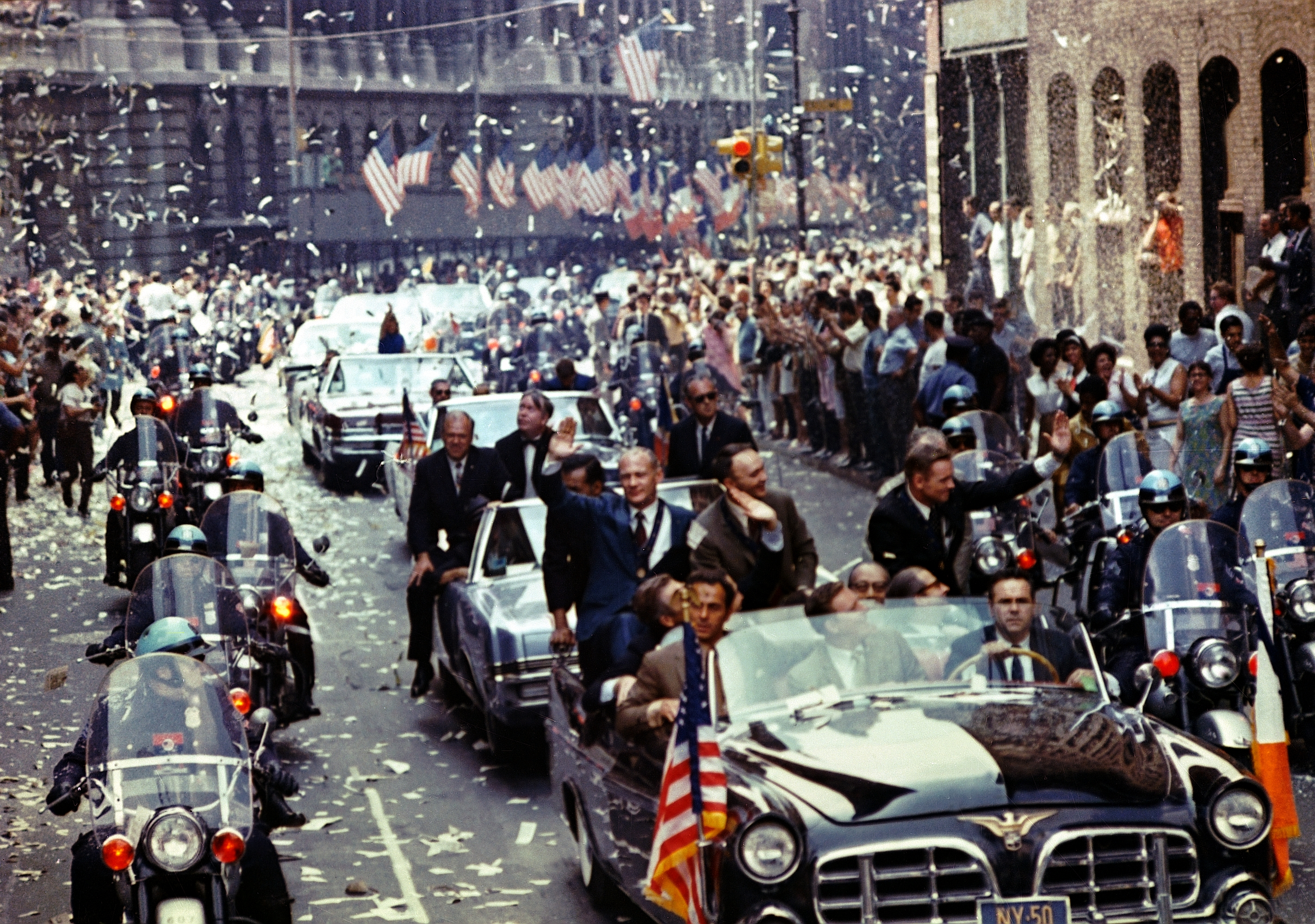
New York City ticker tape parade, August 13, 1969

The tour began on August 13, when the three astronauts spoke and rode in ticker-tape parades in their honor in New York and Chicago, with an estimated six million attendees. On the same evening an official state dinner was held in Los Angeles to celebrate the flight, attended by members of Congress, 44 governors, the Chief Justice of the United States, and ambassadors from 83 nations. President Nixon and Vice President Agnew presented each astronaut with a Presidential Medal of Freedom.

After the tour Armstrong took part in Bob Hope's 1969 USO show, primarily to Vietnam. In May 1970, Armstrong traveled to the Soviet Union to present a talk at the 13th annual conference of the International Committee on Space Research; after arriving in Leningrad from Poland, he traveled to Moscow where he met Premier Alexei Kosygin. Armstrong was the first westerner to see the supersonic Tupolev Tu-144 and was given a tour of the Yuri Gagarin Cosmonaut Training Center, which he described as "a bit Victorian in nature". At the end of the day, he was surprised to view a delayed video of the launch of Soyuz 9 as it had not occurred to Armstrong that the mission was taking place, even though Valentina Tereshkova had been his host and her husband, Andriyan Nikolayev, was on board.

== Life after Apollo ==
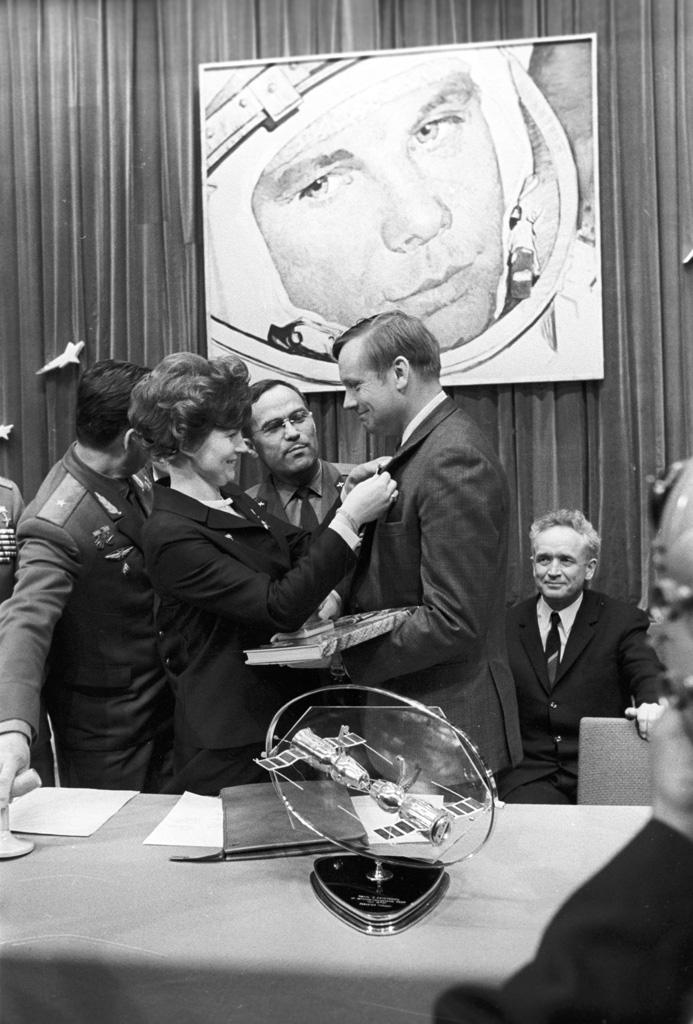
Valentina Tereshkova, the first woman in space, presenting a badge to Neil Armstrong, Star City, Soviet Union, June 1970

=== Teaching ===
Shortly after Apollo 11, Armstrong stated that he did not plan to fly in space again. He was appointed Deputy Associate Administrator for Aeronautics for the Office of Advanced Research and Technology at ARPA, served in the position for a year, then resigned from it and NASA in 1971. He accepted a teaching position in the Department of Aerospace Engineering at the University of Cincinnati, having chosen Cincinnati over other universities, including his alma mater Purdue, because Cincinnati had a small aerospace department, and said he hoped the faculty there would not be annoyed that he came straight into a professorship with only a USC master's degree. He began his master's degree while stationed at Edwards years before, and completed it after Apollo 11 by presenting a report on various aspects of Apollo, instead of a thesis on the simulation of hypersonic flight.

At Cincinnati, Armstrong was University Professor of Aerospace Engineering. He took a heavy teaching load, taught core classes, and created two graduate-level classes: aircraft design and experimental flight mechanics. He was considered a good teacher, and a tough grader. His research activities during this time did not involve his work at NASA, as he did not want to give the appearance of favoritism; he later regretted the decision. After teaching for eight years, Armstrong resigned in 1980. When the university changed from an independent municipal university to a state school, bureaucracy increased. He did not want to be a part of the faculty collective bargaining group, so he decided to teach half-time. According to Armstrong, he had the same amount of work but received half his salary. In 1979, less than 10% of his income came from his university salary. Employees at the university did not know why he left.

=== NASA commissions ===
In 1970, after an explosion aboard Apollo 13 aborted its lunar landing, Armstrong was part of Edgar Cortright's investigation of the mission. He produced a detailed chronology of the flight. He determined that a 28-volt thermostat switch in an oxygen tank, which was supposed to have been replaced with a 65-volt version, led to the explosion. Cortright's report recommended the entire tank be redesigned at a cost of $40 million. Many NASA managers, including Armstrong, opposed the recommendation, since only the thermostat switch had caused the problem. They lost the argument, and the tanks were redesigned.

In 1986, President Ronald Reagan asked Armstrong to join the Rogers Commission investigating the Space Shuttle Challenger disaster. Armstrong was made vice chairman of the commission and held private interviews with contacts he had developed over the years to help determine the cause of the disaster. He helped limit the committee's recommendations to nine, believing that if there were too many, NASA would not act on them.

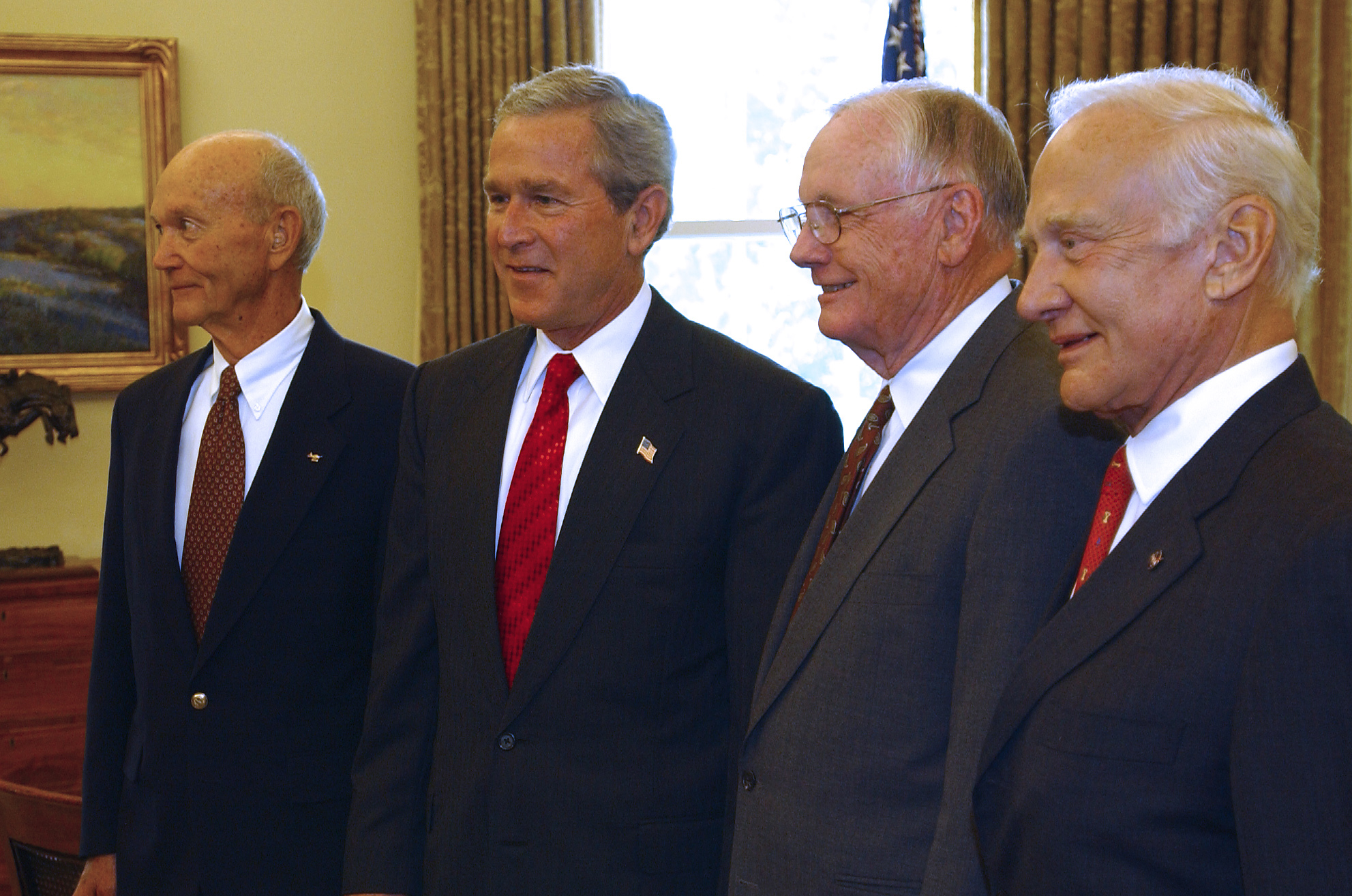
Michael Collins, President George W. Bush, Neil Armstrong, and Buzz Aldrin during celebrations of the 35th anniversary of the Apollo 11 flight, July 21, 2004

Armstrong was appointed to a fourteen-member commission by President Reagan to develop a plan for American civilian spaceflight in the 21st century. The commission was chaired by former NASA administrator Dr. Thomas O. Paine, with whom Armstrong had worked during the Apollo program. The group published a book titled Pioneering the Space Frontier: The Report on the National Commission on Space, recommending a permanent lunar base by 2006, and sending people to Mars by 2015. The recommendations were largely ignored, overshadowed by the Challenger disaster.

Armstrong and his wife attended the memorial service for the victims of the Space Shuttle Columbia disaster in 2003, at the invitation of President George W. Bush.

=== Business activities ===
After Armstrong retired from NASA in 1971, he acted as a spokesman for several businesses. The first company to successfully approach him was Chrysler, for whom he appeared in advertising starting in January 1979. Armstrong thought they had a strong engineering division, and they were in financial difficulty. He later acted as a spokesman for other American companies, including General Time Corporation and the Bankers Association of America. He acted as a spokesman for only American companies.

In addition to his duties as a spokesman, he also served on the board of directors of several companies. The first company board Armstrong joined was Gates Learjet, chairing their technical committee. He flew their new and experimental jets and even set a climb and altitude record for business jets. Armstrong became a member of Cincinnati Gas & Electric Company's board in 1973. They were interested in nuclear power and wanted to increase the company's technical competence. He served on the board of Taft Broadcasting, also based in Cincinnati. Armstrong joined the board of solid rocket booster Thiokol in 1989, after previously serving on the Rogers Commission which found that the Space Shuttle Challenger was destroyed due to a defect in the Thiokol-manufactured solid rocket boosters. When Armstrong left the University of Cincinnati, he became the chairman of Cardwell International Ltd., a company that manufactured drilling rigs. He served on additional aerospace boards, first United Airlines in 1978, and later Eaton Corporation in 1980. He was asked to chair the board of directors for a subsidiary of Eaton, AIL Systems. He chaired the board through the company's 2000 merger with EDO Corporation, until his retirement in 2002.

=== North Pole and Ecuador expeditions ===
In 1976, Stanley Hall of Scotland arranged one of the most expensive large-scale cave explorations in modern history to investigate Cueva de los Tayos in Ecuador. For the expedition, over a hundred people were recruited, including members of the Scottish Black Watch and the Royal Highland Fusiliers regiment, Ecuadorian military personnel, and various experts in different fields, including Armstrong, then a professor of aerospace engineering at the University of Cincinnati, as Honorary President of the expedition.

In 1985, professional expedition leader Mike Dunn organized a trip to take men he deemed the "greatest explorers" to the North Pole. The group included Armstrong, Edmund Hillary, Hillary's son Peter, Steve Fossett, and Patrick Morrow. They arrived at the Pole on April 6, 1985. He did not inform the media of the trip, preferring to keep it private.

=== Public profile ===
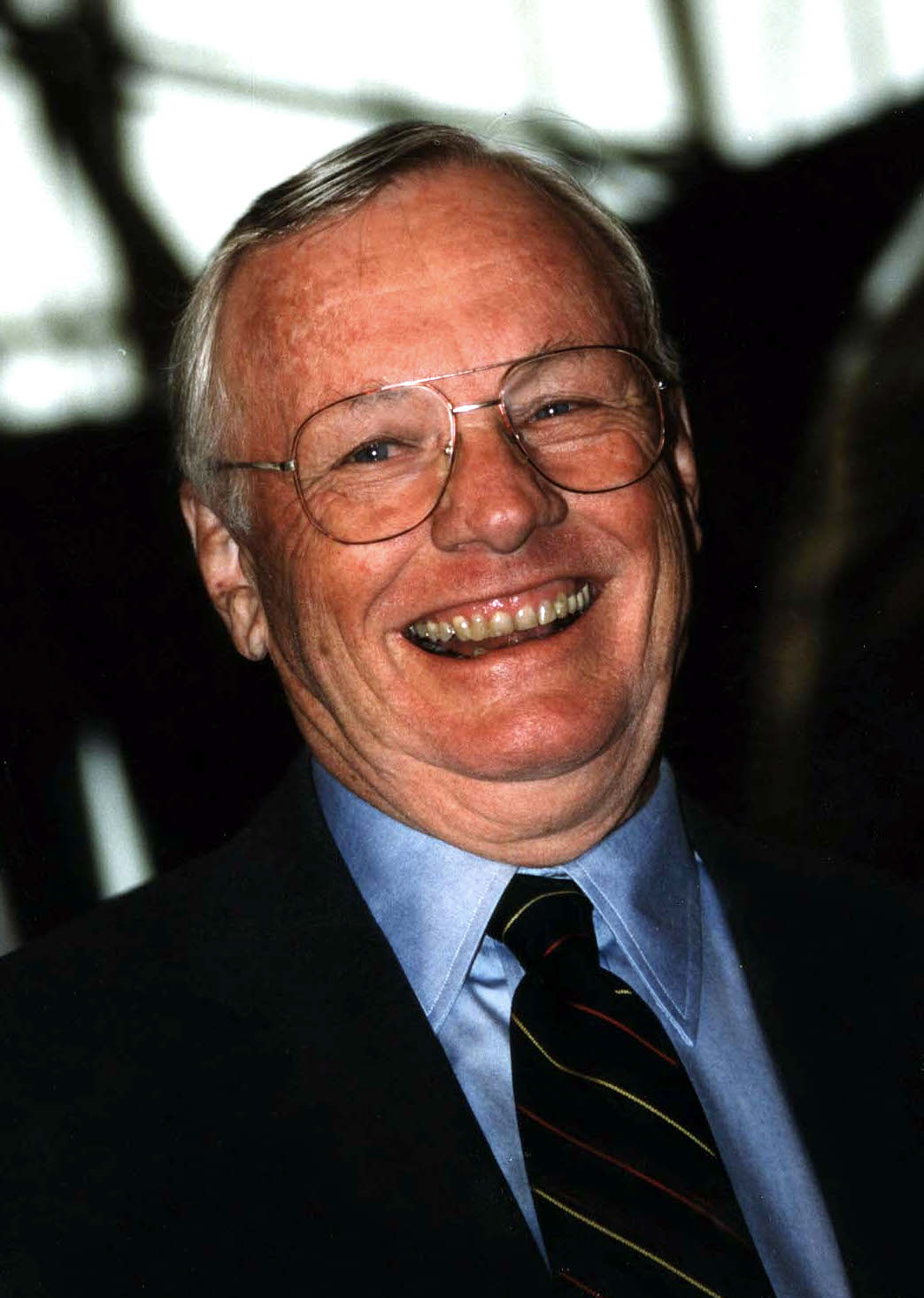
Armstrong in 1999

Armstrong's family described him as a "reluctant American hero". He kept a low profile later in his life, leading to the belief that he was a recluse. Recalling Armstrong's humility, John Glenn, the first American to orbit Earth, told CNN: "[Armstrong] didn't feel that he should be out huckstering himself. He was a humble person, and that's the way he remained after his lunar flight, as well as before." Armstrong turned down most requests for interviews and public appearances. Michael Collins said in his book Carrying the Fire that when Armstrong moved to a dairy farm to become a college professor, it was like he "retreated to his castle and pulled up the drawbridge". Armstrong found this amusing, and said, "... those of us that live out in the hinterlands think that people that live inside the Beltway are the ones that have the problems."

Andrew Chaikin says in A Man on the Moon that Armstrong kept a low profile but was not a recluse, citing his participation in interviews, advertisements for Chrysler, and hosting a cable television series. Between 1991 and 1993, he hosted First Flights with Neil Armstrong, an aviation history documentary series on A&E. In 2010, Armstrong voiced the character of Dr. Jack Morrow in Quantum Quest: A Cassini Space Odyssey, an animated educational sci-fi adventure film initiated by JPL/NASA through a grant from Jet Propulsion Lab.

Armstrong guarded the use of his name, image, and famous quote. When it was launched in 1981, MTV wanted to use his quote in its station identification, with the American flag replaced with the MTV logo, but he refused the use of his voice and likeness. He sued Hallmark Cards in 1994, when they used his name, and a recording of the "one small step" quote, in a Christmas ornament without his permission. The lawsuit was settled out of court for an undisclosed sum, which Armstrong donated to Purdue.

For many years, he wrote letters congratulating new Eagle Scouts on their accomplishment, but decided to quit the practice in the 1990s because he felt the letters should be written by people who knew the scout. (In 2003, he received 950 congratulation requests.) This contributed to the myth of his reclusiveness. Armstrong used to autograph everything except first day covers. Around 1993, he found out his signatures were being sold online, and that most of them were forgeries, and stopped giving autographs.

=== Other activities ===
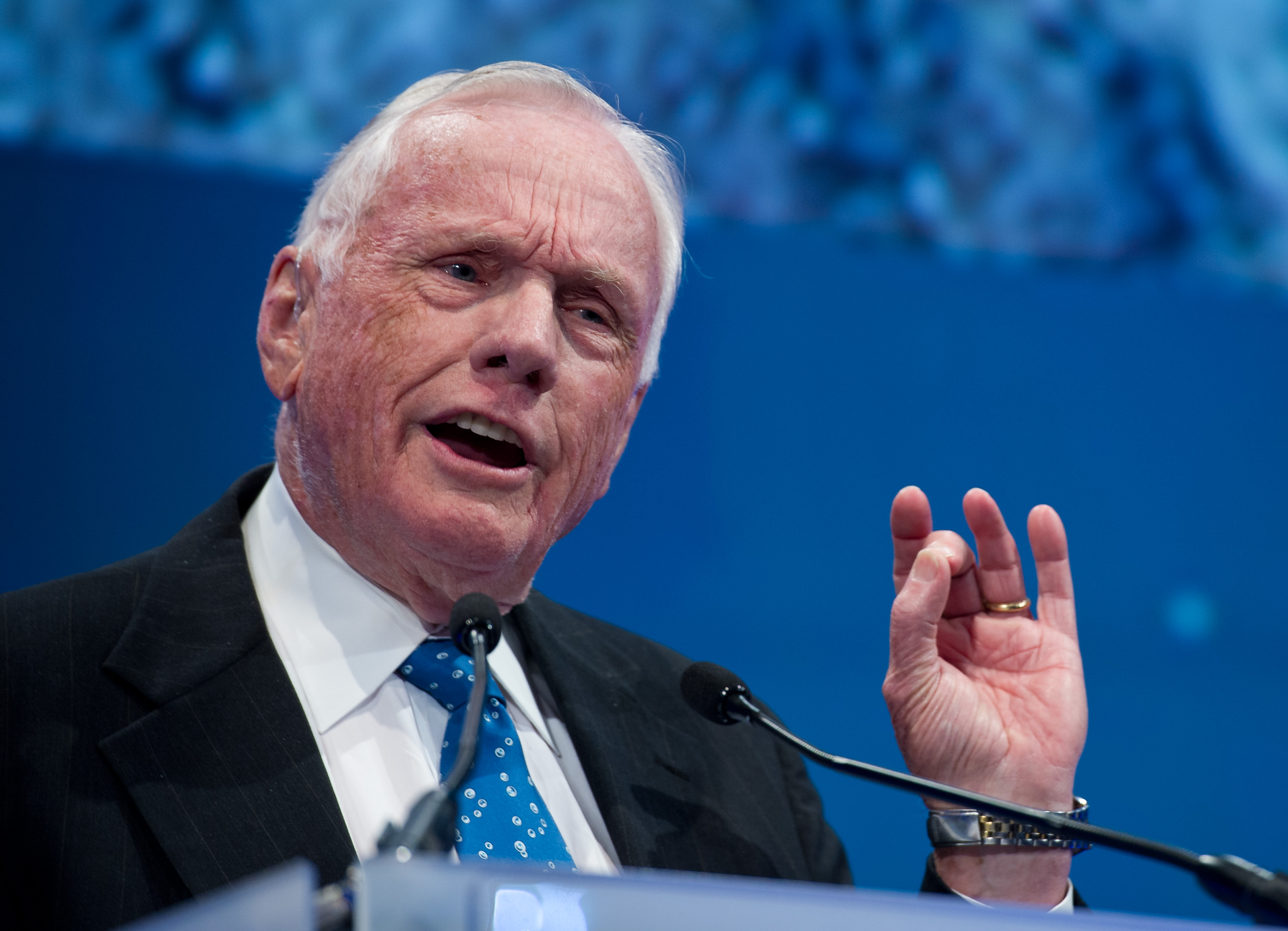
Armstrong speaking in February 2012, six months before his death, on the 50th anniversary of John Glenn's first spaceflight

Some former astronauts, including Glenn and Apollo 17's Harrison Schmitt, sought political careers after leaving NASA. Armstrong was approached by groups from both the Democratic and Republican parties but declined the offers. He supported states' rights and opposed the U.S. acting as the "world's policeman".

When Armstrong applied at a local Methodist church to lead a Boy Scout troop in the late 1950s, he gave his religious affiliation as "deist". His mother later said that his religious views caused her grief and distress in later life, as she was a Christian. Upon his return from the Moon, Armstrong gave a speech in front of the U.S. Congress in which he thanked them for giving him the opportunity to see some of the "grandest views of the Creator". In the early 1980s, he was the subject of a hoax claiming that he converted to Islam after hearing the call to prayer while walking on the Moon. Indonesian singer Suhaemi wrote a song called "Gema Suara Adzan di Bulan" ("The Resonant Sound of the Call to Prayer on the Moon") which described Armstrong's supposed conversion, and the song was widely discussed by Jakarta news outlets in 1983. Similar hoax stories were seen in Egypt and Malaysia. In March 1983, the U.S. State Department responded by issuing a message to embassies and consulates in Muslim countries saying that Armstrong had not converted to Islam. The hoax surfaced occasionally for the next three decades. Part of the confusion arose from the similarity between the names of the country of Lebanon, which has a majority Muslim population, and Armstrong's longtime residence in Lebanon, Ohio.

In 1972, Armstrong visited the Scottish town of Langholm, the traditional seat of Clan Armstrong. He was made the first freeman of the burgh, and happily declared the town his home. To entertain the crowd, the Justice of the Peace read from an unrepealed archaic 400-year-old law that required him to hang any Armstrong found in the town.

Armstrong flew light aircraft for pleasure. He enjoyed gliders and before the Moon flight had earned a gold badge with two diamonds from the International Gliding Commission. He continued to fly engineless aircraft well into his 70s.

While working on his farm in November 1978, Armstrong jumped off the back of his grain truck and caught his wedding ring in its wheel, tearing the tip off his left ring finger. He collected the severed tip, packed it in ice, and had surgeons reattach it at a nearby hospital in Louisville, Kentucky. In February 1991, he suffered a mild heart attack while skiing with friends at Aspen, Colorado.

Armstrong and his first wife, Janet, separated in 1990 and divorced in 1994 after 38 years of marriage. He met his second wife, Carol Held Knight, at a golf tournament in 1992, when they were seated together at breakfast. She said little to Armstrong, but he called her two weeks later to ask what she was doing. She replied that she was cutting down a cherry tree, and he arrived at her house 35 minutes later to help. They were married in Ohio on June 12, 1994, and had a second ceremony at San Ysidro Ranch in California. They lived in Indian Hill, Ohio. Through his marriage to Carol, he was the father-in-law of future New York Mets general manager Brodie Van Wagenen.

In May 2005, Armstrong became involved in a legal dispute with Mark Sizemore, his barber of 20 years. After cutting Armstrong's hair, Sizemore sold some of it to a collector for $3,000 without Armstrong's knowledge or permission. Armstrong threatened legal action against Sizemore unless he returned the hair or donated the proceeds to a charity of Armstrong's choosing. Sizemore, unable to retrieve the hair, donated the proceeds to charity.

== Illness and death ==
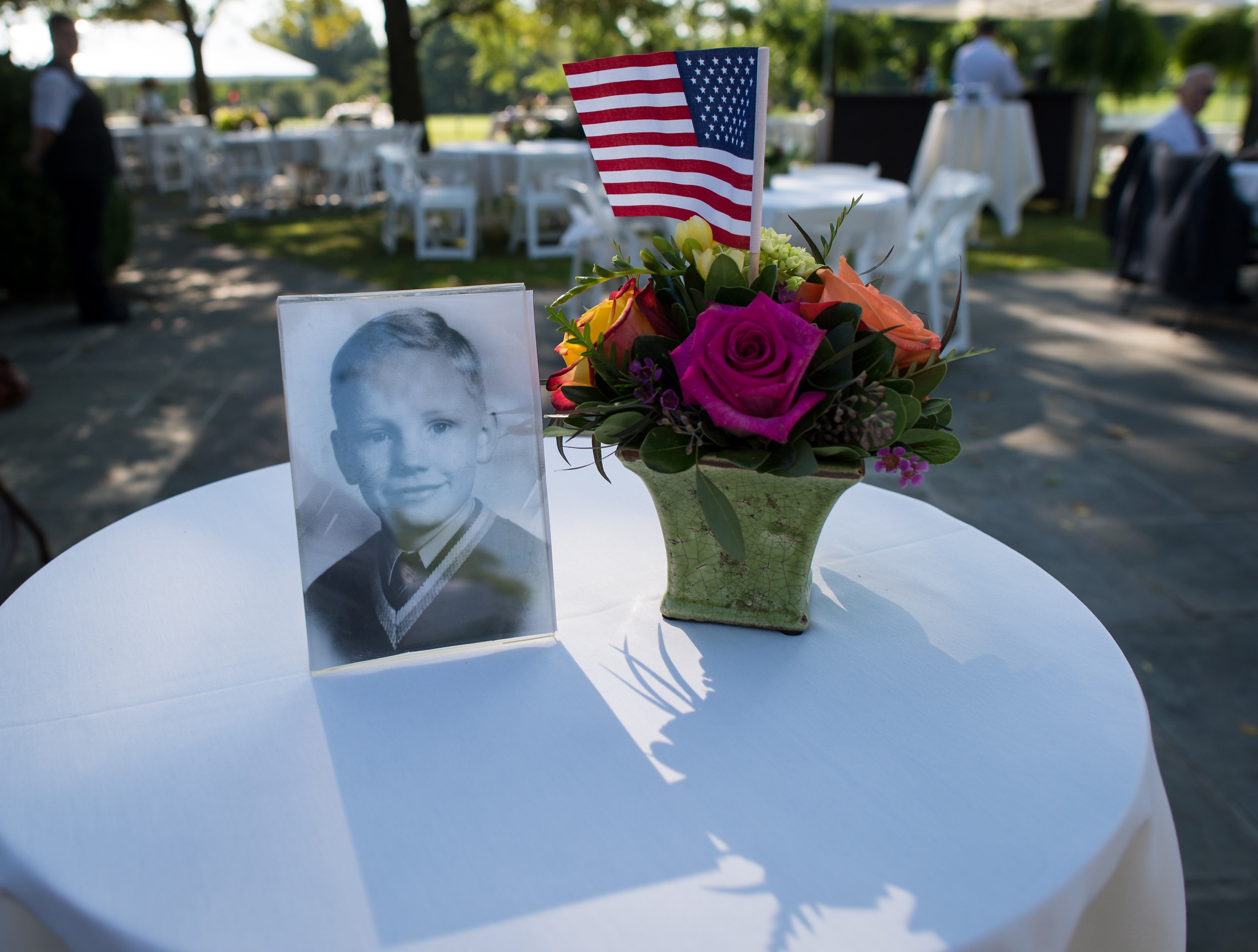
Photograph of Armstrong as a boy at his family memorial service in Indian Hill, Ohio, near Cincinnati, on August 31, 2012

On August 7, 2012, Armstrong underwent bypass surgery at Mercy Health Fairfield Hospital in Fairfield, Ohio, to relieve coronary artery disease. Although he was reportedly recovering well, he developed complications and died on August 25. President Barack Obama issued a statement memorializing Armstrong as "among the greatest of American heroes—not just of his time, but of all time", and added that Armstrong had carried the aspirations of the United States' citizens and had delivered "a moment of human achievement that will never be forgotten".

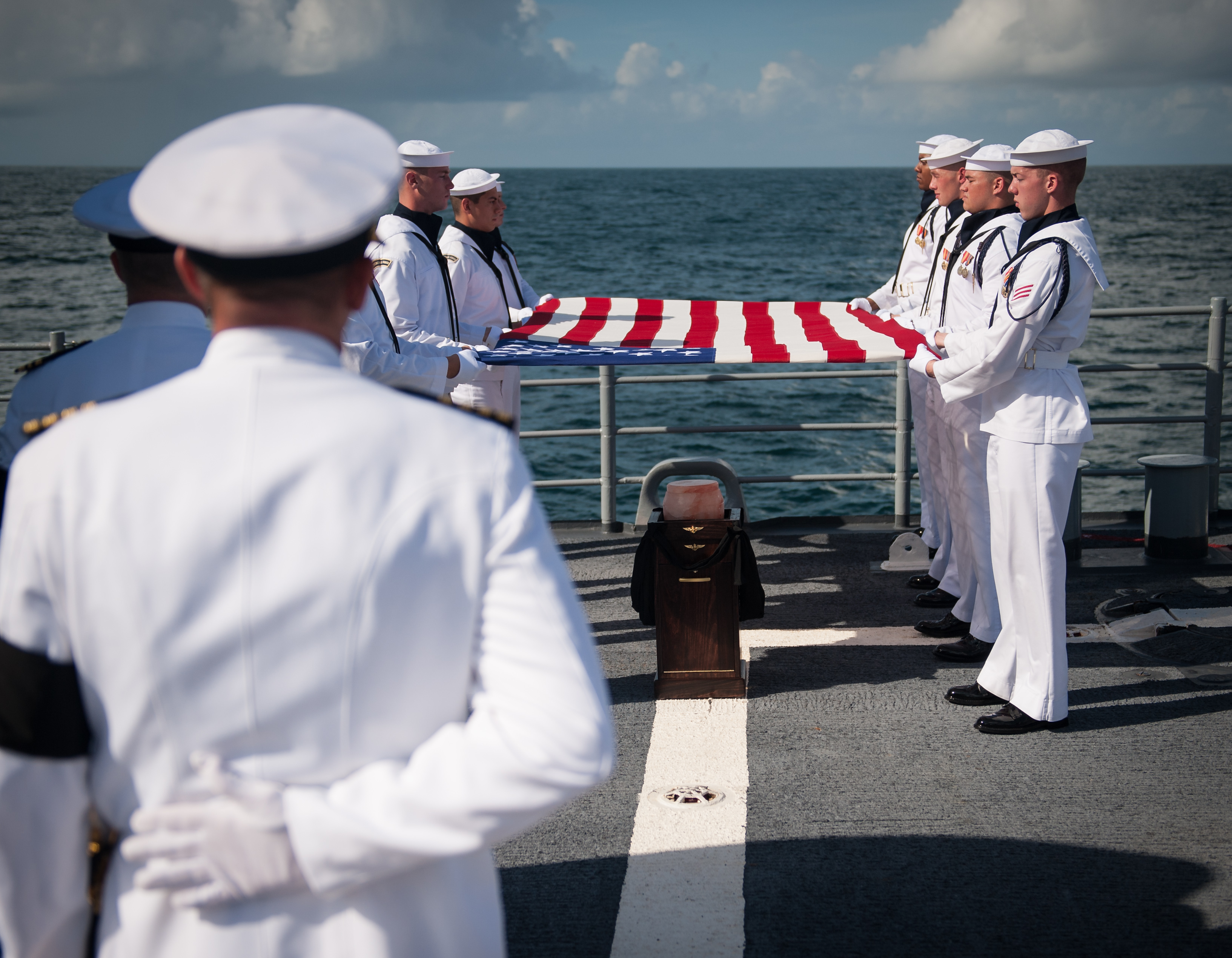
Armstrong's burial at sea on September 14, 2012

Armstrong's family released a statement describing him as a "reluctant American hero [who had] served his nation proudly, as a navy fighter pilot, test pilot, and astronaut ... While we mourn the loss of a very good man, we also celebrate his remarkable life and hope that it serves as an example to young people around the world to work hard to make their dreams come true, to be willing to explore and push the limits, and to selflessly serve a cause greater than themselves. For those who may ask what they can do to honor Neil, we have a simple request. Honor his example of service, accomplishment and modesty, and the next time you walk outside on a clear night and see the moon smiling down at you, think of Neil Armstrong and give him a wink."

Buzz Aldrin called Armstrong "a true American hero and the best pilot I ever knew", and said he was disappointed that they would not be able to celebrate the 50th anniversary of the Moon landing together in 2019. Michael Collins said, "He was the best, and I will miss him terribly." NASA administrator Charles Bolden said, "As long as there are history books, Neil Armstrong will be included in them, remembered for taking humankind's first small step on a world beyond our own".

External videos
- Memorial service for Armstrong, Washington National Cathedral, September 13, 2012, C-SPAN

A tribute was held for Armstrong on September 13, at Washington National Cathedral, whose Space Window depicts the Apollo 11 mission and holds a sliver of Moon rock amid its stained-glass panels. In attendance were Armstrong's Apollo 11 crewmates, Collins and Aldrin; Gene Cernan, the Apollo 17 mission commander and last man to walk on the Moon; and former senator and astronaut John Glenn, the first American to orbit the Earth. In his eulogy, Charles Bolden praised Armstrong's "courage, grace, and humility". Cernan recalled Armstrong's low-fuel approach to the Moon: "When the gauge says empty, we all know there's a gallon or two left in the tank!" Diana Krall sang the song "Fly Me to the Moon". Collins led prayers. David Scott spoke, possibly for the first time, about an incident during their Gemini 8 mission: minutes before the hatch was to be sealed, a small chip of dried glue fell into the latch of his harness and prevented it from being buckled, threatening to abort the mission. Armstrong then called on Conrad to solve the problem, which he did, and the mission proceeded. "That happened because Neil Armstrong was a team player—he always worked on behalf of the team." Congressman Bill Johnson from Armstrong's home state of Ohio led calls for President Barack Obama to authorize a state funeral in Washington D.C. Throughout his lifetime, Armstrong shunned publicity and rarely gave interviews. Mindful that Armstrong would have objected to a state funeral, his family opted to have a private funeral in Cincinnati. On September 14, Armstrong's cremated remains were scattered in the Atlantic Ocean from the USS Philippine Sea. Flags were flown at half-staff on the day of Armstrong's funeral.

In July 2019, after observations of the 50th anniversary of the Moon landing, The New York Times reported on details of a medical malpractice suit Armstrong's family had filed against Mercy Health–Fairfield Hospital, where he died. When Armstrong appeared to be recovering from his bypass surgery, nurses removed the wires connected to his temporary pacemaker. He began to bleed internally and his blood pressure dropped. Doctors took him to the hospital's catheterization laboratory, and only later began operating. Two of the three physicians who reviewed the medical files during the lawsuit called this a serious error, saying surgery should have begun immediately; experts the Times talked to, while qualifying their judgment by noting that they were unable to review the specific records in the case, said that taking a patient directly to the operating room under those circumstances generally gave them the highest chance of survival.

The family ultimately settled for $6 million in 2014. Letters included with the 93 pages of documents sent to the Times by an unknown person show that his sons intimated to the hospital, through their lawyers, that they might discuss what happened to their father publicly at the 45th anniversary observances in 2014. The hospital, fearing the bad publicity that would result from being accused of negligently causing the death of a revered figure such as Armstrong, agreed to pay as long as the family never spoke about the suit or the settlement. Armstrong's wife, Carol, was not a party to the lawsuit. She reportedly felt that her husband would have been opposed to taking legal action.

== Legacy ==
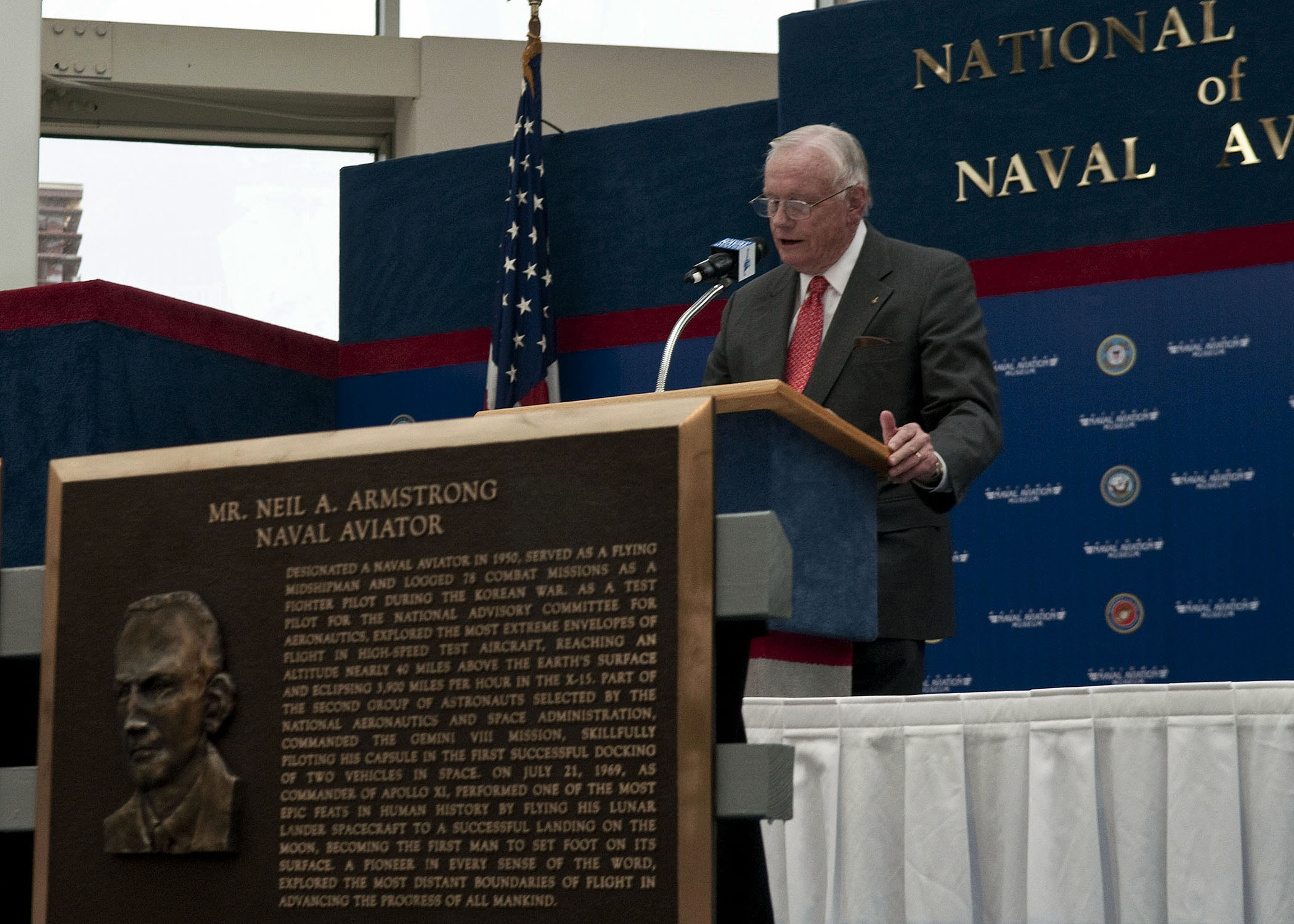
Armstrong gives an acceptance speech after being inducted into the Naval Aviation Hall of Honor at the National Naval Aviation Museum in Pensacola, Florida.

When Pete Conrad of Apollo 12 became the third man to walk on the Moon, on November 19, 1969, his first words referenced Armstrong. The shorter of the two, when Conrad stepped from the LM onto the surface he proclaimed "Whoopie! Man, that may have been a small one for Neil, but that's a long one for me."

Armstrong received many honors and awards, including the Presidential Medal of Freedom (with distinction) from President Nixon, the Cullum Geographical Medal from the American Geographical Society, and the Collier Trophy from the National Aeronautic Association (1969); the NASA Distinguished Service Medal and the Dr. Robert H. Goddard Memorial Trophy (1970); the Sylvanus Thayer Award by the United States Military Academy (1971); the Congressional Space Medal of Honor from President Jimmy Carter (1978); the Wright Brothers Memorial Trophy from the National Aeronautic Association (2001); and a Congressional Gold Medal (2011).

Armstrong was elected as member into the National Academy of Engineering in 1978 for contributions to aerospace engineering, scientific knowledge, and exploration of the universe as an experimental test pilot and astronaut. He was elected to the American Philosophical Society in 2001.

Armstrong and his Apollo 11 crewmates were the 1999 recipients of the Langley Gold Medal from the Smithsonian Institution. On April 18, 2006, he received NASA's Ambassador of Exploration Award. The Space Foundation named Armstrong as a recipient of its 2013 General James E. Hill Lifetime Space Achievement Award. Armstrong was also inducted into the Aerospace Walk of Honor, the International Space Hall of Fame, National Aviation Hall of Fame, and the United States Astronaut Hall of Fame. He was awarded his Naval Astronaut badge in a ceremony on board the aircraft carrier USS Dwight D. Eisenhower on March 10, 2010, in a ceremony attended by Lovell and Cernan.

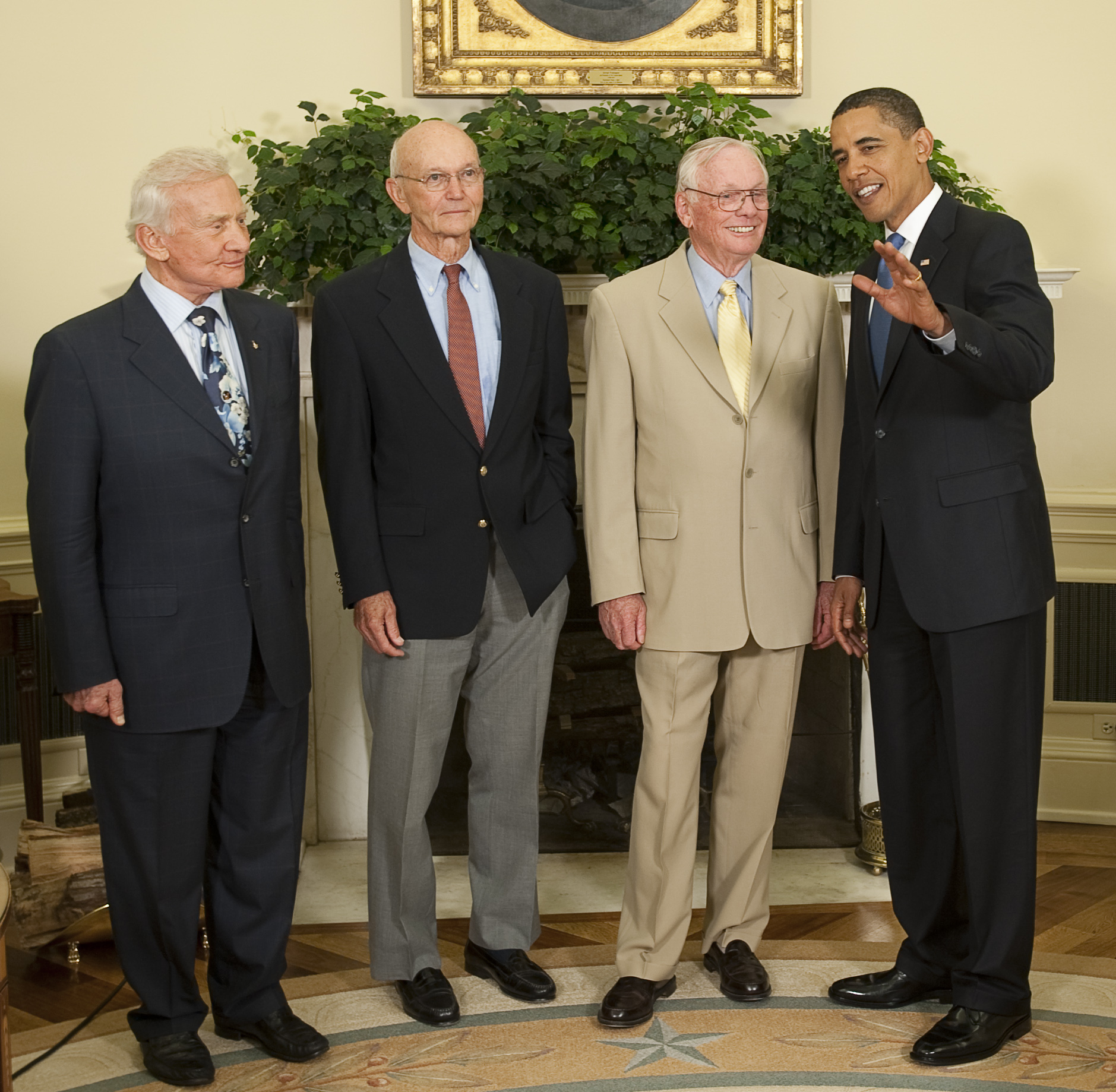
President Barack Obama poses with the Apollo 11 crew on the 40th anniversary of the Apollo 11 lunar landing, July 20, 2009: Buzz Aldrin, Michael Collins, and Neil Armstrong.

The lunar crater Armstrong, 31 miles (50 km) from the Apollo 11 landing site, and asteroid 6469 Armstrong are named in his honor. There are more than a dozen elementary, middle and high schools named for Armstrong in the United States, and many places around the world have streets, buildings, schools, and other places named for him or Apollo. The Armstrong Air and Space Museum, in Armstrong's hometown of Wapakoneta, and the Neil Armstrong Airport in New Knoxville, Ohio, are named after him. The mineral armstrongite is named after him, and the mineral armalcolite is named, in part, after him.

In October 2004 Purdue University named its new engineering building Neil Armstrong Hall of Engineering; the building was dedicated on October 27, 2007, during a ceremony at which Armstrong was joined by fourteen other Purdue astronauts. The NASA Dryden Flight Research Center was renamed the NASA Neil A. Armstrong Flight Research Center in 2014. NASA has separately renamed the Plum Brook Station test site at Glenn Research Center as Neil A. Armstrong Test Facility. In September 2012, the U.S. Navy named the first Armstrong-class vessel RV Neil Armstrong. Delivered to the Navy on September 23, 2015, it is a modern oceanographic research platform supporting a wide range of activities by academic groups. In 2019, the College of Engineering at Purdue University celebrated the 50th anniversary of Neil Armstrong's walk on the Moon by launching the Neil Armstrong Distinguished Visiting Fellows Program, which brings highly accomplished scholars and practitioners to the college to catalyze collaborations with faculty and students.

External videos
- Presentation by James Hansen on First Man, November 9, 2005, C-SPAN

Armstrong's authorized biography, First Man: The Life of Neil A. Armstrong, was published in 2005. For many years, he turned down biography offers from authors such as Stephen Ambrose and James A. Michener but agreed to work with James R. Hansen after reading one of Hansen's other biographies. He recalled his initial concerns about the Apollo 11 mission, when he had believed there was only a 50% chance of landing on the Moon. "I was elated, ecstatic and extremely surprised that we were successful". A film adaptation of the book, starring Ryan Gosling and directed by Damien Chazelle, was released in October 2018.

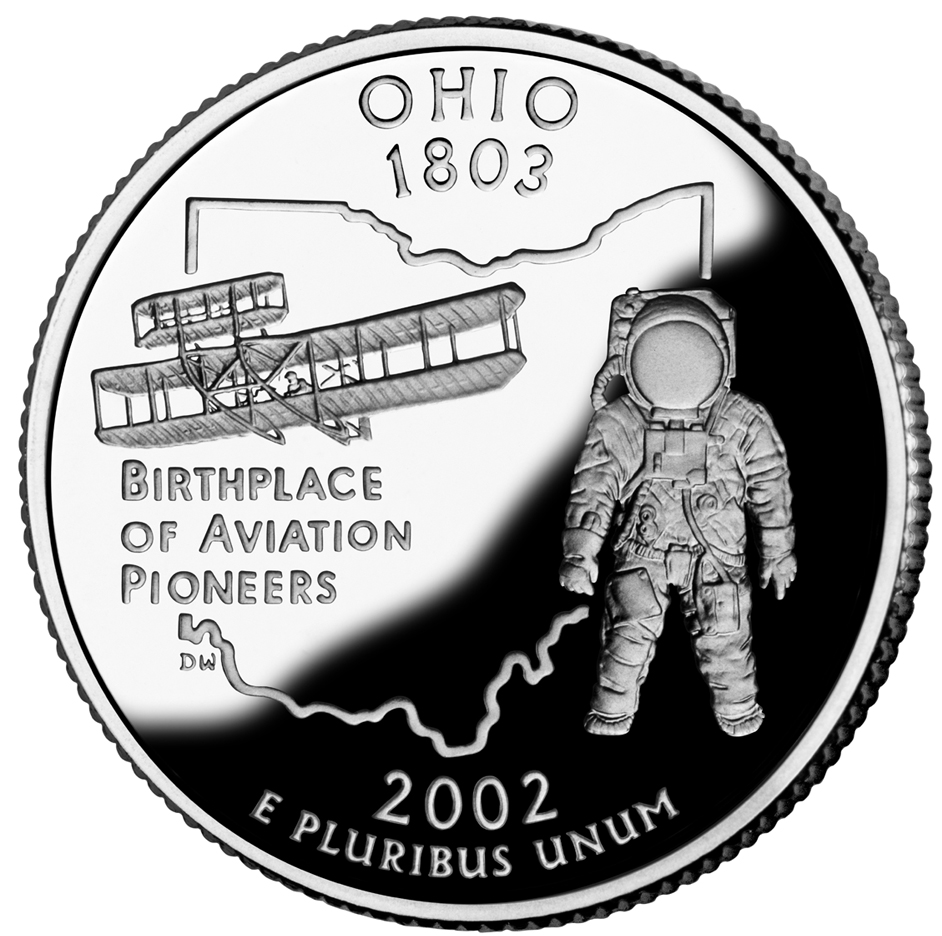
Ohio's state quarter depicts Armstrong and the Wright brothers' Wright Flyer III.

In July 2018, Armstrong's sons consigned his collection of memorabilia to Heritage Auctions, launching a series of sales that including his Boy Scout cap, and various flags and medals flown on his space missions. A series of auctions held November 1–3, 2018, realized $5,276,320 (~$6.65 million in 2025). As of July 2019, the auction sales totaled $16.7 million. Two fragments of wood from the propeller and four pieces of fabric from the wing of the 1903 Wright Flyer that Armstrong took to the Moon fetched between $112,500 and $275,000 each, as well as his Apollo 11 flown gold medal, which fetched $2.06 million in a separate Heritage sale. Armstrong's wife, Carol, has not put any of his memorabilia up for sale.

Armstrong donated his papers to Purdue. Along with posthumous donations by his widow Carol, the collection consists of over 450 boxes of material. In May 2019, she donated two 25-by-24-inch (640 by 610 mm) pieces of fabric from the Wright Flyer, along with his correspondence related to them.

In a 2010 Space Foundation survey, Armstrong was ranked as the number-one most popular space hero; and in 2013, Flying magazine ranked him number one on its list of 51 Heroes of Aviation. The press often asked Armstrong for his views on the future of spaceflight. In 2005, he said that a human mission to Mars would be easier than the lunar challenge of the 1960s. In 2010, he made a rare public criticism of the decision to cancel the Ares I launch vehicle and the Constellation Moon landing program. In an open letter also signed by fellow Apollo veterans Lovell and Cernan, he said, "For The United States, the leading space faring nation for nearly half a century, to be without carriage to low Earth orbit and with no human exploration capability to go beyond Earth orbit for an indeterminate time into the future, destines our nation to become one of second or even third rate stature". On November 18, 2010, aged 80, he said in a speech during the Science & Technology Summit in the Hague, Netherlands, that he would offer his services as commander on a mission to Mars if he were asked.

The planetarium at Altoona Area High School in Altoona, Pennsylvania is named after Armstrong and is home to a Space Race museum. A campsite in Camp Sandy Beach at Yawgoog Scout Reservation in Rockville, Rhode Island, is named in his honor, a nod to his Scouting career.

Armstrong was named the class exemplar for the Class of 2019 at the U.S. Air Force Academy.

== Notes ==
Preceded by Ellsworth Bunker	Sylvanus Thayer Award recipient 1971	Succeeded by Billy Graham
