= Naval Aviation Hall of Honor =

Coordinates: 30.3495°N 87.3035°W

The United States Naval Aviation Hall of Honor, located at the National Naval Aviation Museum in Pensacola, Florida, recognizes individuals "who by their actions or achievements made outstanding contributions to Naval Aviation." Since its inception in 1979, the Hall of Honor has enshrined 80 people representing every element of the naval aviation family: U.S. Navy, U.S. Marine Corps, U.S. Coast Guard, Civilian and every naval aviation warfare community. Selectees are chosen by a board appointed by the Director, Air Warfare Division, Office of the Chief of Naval Operations, sponsor of the Hall of Honor, and approved by the Chief of Naval Operations.

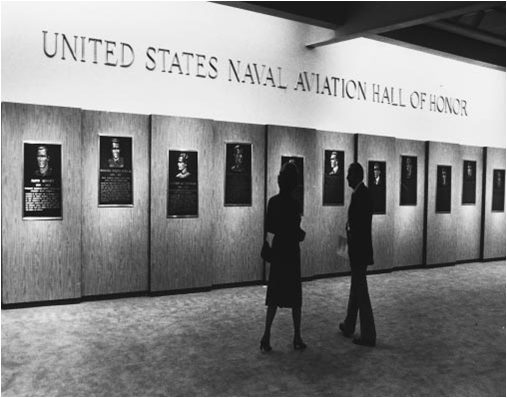
Hall of Honor in Pensacola, Florida.

== Inductees ==
Inductee	Year Inducted
VADM Patrick N. L. Bellinger, USN	1981
CWO Floyd Bennett, USN	1981
RADM Richard E. Byrd, Jr., USN	1981
LtCol Alfred A. Cunningham, USMC	1981
Mr. Glenn H. Curtiss, Civilian	1981
LCDR Godfrey Chevalier, USN	1981
Mr. Eugene Burton Ely, Civilian	1981
CDR Theodore G. Ellyson, USN	1981
RADM William A. Moffett, USN	1981
RADM Albert Cushing Read, USN	1981
CAPT Holden C. Richardson, USN	1981
ADM John Henry Towers, USN	1981
Gen Roy Geiger, USMC	1983
Mr. Glenn Martin, Civilian	1983
ADM Marc Mitscher, USN	1983
ADM Arthur W. Radford, USN	1983
VADM Charles E. Rosendahl, USN	1983
CDR Elmer Fowler Stone, USCG	1983
VADM James H. Flatley, Jr., USN	1984
Mr. Leroy Grumman, Civilian	1984
ADM John S. Thach, USN	1984
CAPT Kenneth Whiting, USN	1984
MajGen Marion Eugene Carl, USMC	1986
FADM William F. Halsey, USN	1986
Mr. Ed Heinemann, Civilian	1986
RADM David Sinton Ingalls, USNR	1986
CAPT Donald Bantram MacDiarmid, USCG	1986
VADM Robert B. Pirie, USN	1986
GySgt Robert G. Robinson, USMCR	1986
VADM Frederick M. Trapnell, USN	1986
CAPT Washington Irving Chambers, USN	1988
Dr. Jerome Clarke Hunsaker, Civilian	1988
CAPT David McCampbell, USN	1988
Gen Keith B. McCutcheon, USMC	1988
ADM Thomas Hinman Moorer, USN	1988
ADM Alfred M. Pride, USN	1988
CAPT Frank A. Erickson, USCG	1990
CAPT Henry C. Mustin, USN	1990
ADM James Sargent Russell, USN	1990
RADM Alan Shepard, USN	1990
Mr. Igor Sikorsky, Civilian	1990
Mr. George Spangenberg, Civilian	1990
VADM Gerald F. Bogan, USN	1992
ADM Austin Kelvin Doyle, USN	1992
LCDR Edward H. "Butch" O'Hare, USN	1992
VADM William A. Schoech, USN	1992
Mr. Lawrence Sperry, Civilian	1992
COL Gregory "Pappy" Boyington, USMC	1994
Brig Gen Joseph Jacob Foss, ANG	1994
CAPT Ashton Graybiel, MC, USN	1994
ADM Frederick H. Michaelis, USN	1994
VADM Apollo Soucek, USN	1994
RADM Joseph C. Clifton, USN	1996
Mr. Charles Kaman, Civilian	1996
Gen Christian F. Schilt, USMC	1996
ADM Forrest Sherman, USN	1996
VADM James Stockdale, USN	1996
ADM Maurice F. Weisner, USN	1996
Mr. Rex Buren Beisel, Civilian	2000
Gen William O. Brice, USMC	2000
VADM William I. Martin, USN	2000
CAPT Wally Schirra, USN	2000
FADM Ernest King, USN	2002
ADM Joseph M. Reeves, USN	2002
CAPT Roy Marlin "Butch" Voris, USN	2002
LtCol Kenneth A. Walsh, USMC	2002
ADM Arleigh Burke, USN	2004
VADM Thomas F. Connolly, USN	2004
VADM Donald D. Engen, USN	2004
Senator John H. Glenn Jr., Col, USMC	2004
VADM John T. Hayward, USN	2004
CAPT Robert E. Mitchell, MC, USN	2004
VADM Thomas G. W. Settle, USN	2004
ADM James L. Holloway III, USN	2004
CAPT Jim Lovell, USN	2004
CDR Stuart R. Graham, USCG	2004
BGen Robert E. Galer, USMC	2004
CAPT Eugene Cernan, USN	2006
CAPT Arthur Ray Hawkins, USN	2006
ADM Stanley R. Arthur, USN	2008
LtCol Harold W. Bauer, USMC	2008
RADM C. Wade McClusky, USN	2008
RADM James D. Ramage, USN	2008
CAPT Robert L. Rasmussen, USN	2008
LtGen Thomas H. Miller, USMC	2010
Mr. Neil Armstrong	2010
VADM William P. Lawrence, USN	2010
CAPT Richard P. Bordone, USN	2010
President George H. W. Bush	2011

== See also ==
- North American aviation halls of fame
- Flying Leatherneck Aviation Museum
- United States Marine Corps Aviation
