= One small step =

Neil Armstrong's words on landing on the Moon

"That's one small step for man, one giant leap for mankind"

Neil Armstrong setting foot on the Moon's surface and saying the phrase

On July 21, 1969, when Neil Armstrong became the first person to set foot on the Moon, he said "That's one small step for [a] man, one giant leap for mankind". Recordings of Armstrong's Apollo 11 transmission do not provide evidence for the indefinite article "a" before "man", leading to some controversy about whether he said the word or not.

After years of Armstrong and NASA insisting that the static obscured it, Armstrong conceded that he must have dropped the "a" after carefully listening to the recording. Several scientific analyses have been conducted with some suggesting that he did say the "a" and others suggesting that he did not. As a result, the "a" is often included in brackets in the quote.

== Background ==
The Lunar Module Eagle landed on the Moon as part of Apollo 11 in 1969. After Armstrong and Buzz Aldrin were ready to go outside, Eagle was depressurized, the hatch was opened, and Armstrong made his way down the ladder. At the bottom of the ladder, while standing on a Lunar Module landing pad, Armstrong said, "I'm going to step off the LM now." He turned and set his left boot on the lunar surface at 02:56 UTC July 21, 1969, then said "That's one small step for [a] man, one giant leap for mankind." The exact time of Armstrong's first step on the Moon is unclear.

When Armstrong made his proclamation, Voice of America was rebroadcast live by the BBC and many other stations worldwide. An estimated 530 million people viewed the event, 20 percent out of a world population of approximately 3.6 billion.

== Wording ==
Armstrong prepared his famous epigram on his own. In a post-flight press conference, he said that he chose the words "just prior to leaving the LM". In a 1983 interview in Esquire magazine, he explained to George Plimpton: "I always knew there was a good chance of being able to return to Earth, but I thought the chances of a successful touch down on the moon surface were about even money—fifty–fifty ... Most people don't realize how difficult the mission was. So it didn't seem to me there was much point in thinking of something to say if we'd have to abort landing."

In 2012, his brother Dean Armstrong said that Neil showed him a draft of the line months before the launch. Historian Andrew Chaikin, who interviewed Armstrong in 1988 for his book A Man on the Moon, disputed that Armstrong claimed to have conceived the line during the mission.

People have speculated that the line was inspired by The Hobbit by J. R. R. Tolkien, in which Bilbo Baggins's jump over Gollum is described as "not a great leap for a man, but a leap in the dark". After leaving NASA in 1971 and moving to a farm in Lebanon, Ohio, Armstrong named the farm "Rivendell", a valley in Tolkien's works. In the 1990s Armstrong also had an email address related to Tolkien. Armstrong however said that it was only after Apollo 11 that he read the works of Tolkien. People have also speculated that the idea for the quote may have come from an April 19, 1969, memo by Willis Shapley in which he wrote "the first lunar landing as an historic step forward for all mankind". Armstrong said that he did not remember reading the memo.

Recordings of Armstrong's transmission do not provide evidence for the indefinite article "a" before "man", resulting in "man" having the same perceived meaning as "mankind" rather than "a person". NASA and Armstrong insisted for years that static obscured it. Armstrong stated he would never make such a mistake, but after repeatedly listening to recordings, he eventually conceded he must have dropped the "a". Armstrong later said he "would hope that history would grant me leeway for dropping the syllable and understand that it was certainly intended, even if it was not said—although it might actually have been".

There have since been claims and counter-claims about whether acoustic analysis of the recording reveals the presence of the missing "a". Peter Shann Ford, an Australian computer programmer, conducted a digital audio analysis and claims that Armstrong did say "a man", but the "a" was inaudible due to the limitations of communications technology of the time. Ford and James R. Hansen, Armstrong's authorized biographer, presented these findings to Armstrong and NASA representatives, who conducted their own analysis. Armstrong found Ford's analysis "persuasive". Linguists David Beaver and Mark Liberman wrote of their skepticism of Ford's claims on the blog Language Log. A 2016 peer-reviewed study again concluded Armstrong had included the article. NASA's transcript continues to show the "a" in parentheses.

Q: Did you misspeak?

A: There isn't any way of knowing.

Q: Several sources say you did.

A: I mean, there isn't any way of my knowing. When I listen to the tape, I can't hear the 'a', but that doesn't mean it wasn't there, because that was the fastest VOX ever built. There was no mike-switch — it was a voice-operated key or VOX. In a helmet you find you lose a lot of syllables. Sometimes a short syllable like 'a' might not be transmitted. However, when I listen to it, I can't hear it. But the 'a' is implied, so I'm happy if they just put it in parentheses.

— Omni, June 1982, p. 126

== Protection by Armstrong ==
Armstrong guarded the use of his name, image, and famous quote. When it was launched in 1981, MTV wanted to use his quote in its station identification, with the American flag replaced with the MTV logo, but he refused the use of his voice and likeness. He sued Hallmark Cards in 1994, when they used his name, and a recording of the "one small step" quote, in a Christmas ornament without his permission. The lawsuit was settled out of court for an undisclosed sum, which Armstrong donated to Purdue University.

== Legacy and cultural impact ==
When Pete Conrad of Apollo 12 became the third man to walk on the Moon, on November 19, 1969, his first words referenced Armstrong. The shorter of the two, when Conrad stepped from the LM onto the surface he proclaimed "Whoopie! Man, that may have been a small one for Neil, but that's a long one for me."

Things named after the quote include a 1999 Star Trek: Voyager episode, the 2008 documentary film One Small Step: The Story of the Space Chimps, as well as a 2018 animated short film, a 1990 novella and the 2019 non-fiction book One Giant Leap.

The sculpture of Armstrong at Purdue University has an inscription of the quote.

The quote has been described by Richard Gray for weather.com as the most famous disputed quote in history. Ian Crouch of The New Yorker has described the quote as "among the most famous proclamations of the [20th] century".

In December 2020, the One Small Step to Protect Human Heritage in Space Act was enacted, to protect American lunar landing sites.

A Chinese quote similar to and probably translated or derived from Armstrong's (Chinese: 向前一小步，文明一大步; pinyin: xiàngqián yī xiǎo bù, wénmíng yī dà bù, lit. 'One small step forward, one big step for civilisation') is often placed at urinals in China to encourage users to move closer and reduce the risk of urine falling onto the floor.

== See also ==
- "We choose to go to the Moon", 1962 speech by John F. Kennedy
- "Houston, we have a problem", a 1970 quote attributed to Jack Swigert and Jim Lovell during the Apollo 13 mission and shortened to this well-known form for the 1995 Apollo 13 film
- "Where no man has gone before", quotation from Star Trek

== Sources ==
- Nickell, Duane S. (2008). Guidebook for the Scientific Traveler: Visiting Astronomy and Space. New Brunswick, New Jersey: Rutgers University Press. ISBN 978-0-8135-4374-1. OCLC 190785292.
- Cortright, Edgar M. (1975). "Apollo Expeditions to the Moon". NASA Special Publication. 350. Bibcode:1975NASSP.350.....C. OCLC 251694818. NASA SP 350.
- Hansen, James R. (2005). First Man: The Life of Neil A. Armstrong. New York: Simon & Schuster. ISBN 978-0-7432-5631-5. OCLC 937302502.
- Harland, David (1999). Exploring the Moon: The Apollo Expeditions. London; New York: Springer. ISBN 978-1-85233-099-6. OCLC 982158259.
