= Joseph Francis Shea =

American aerospace engineer (1925–1999)

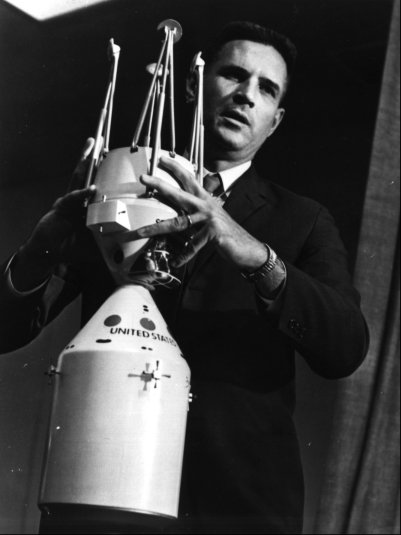
- Shea demonstrates a docking between the Apollo Lunar Module and Command Module, 1962
- Born: September 5, 1925; New York City, U.S.
- Died: February 14, 1999 (aged 73); Weston, Massachusetts, U.S.
- Education: University of Michigan (BS, 1946; MS, 1950; PhD, 1955)
- Occupations: Aerospace engineer NASA manager

Joseph Francis Shea (September 5, 1925 – February 14, 1999) was an American aerospace engineer and NASA manager. Born in the Bronx borough of New York City, he was educated at the University of Michigan, receiving a Ph.D. in Engineering Mechanics in 1955. After working for Bell Labs on the guidance systems of the Titan I and Titan II intercontinental ballistic missiles, he was hired by NASA in 1961. As deputy director of NASA's Office of Manned Space Flight, and later as head of the Apollo Spacecraft Program Office, Shea played a key role in shaping the course of the Apollo program, helping to lead NASA to the decision in favor of lunar orbit rendezvous and supporting "all up" testing of the Saturn V rocket. While sometimes causing controversy within the agency, Shea was remembered by his former colleague George Mueller as "one of the greatest systems engineers of our time".

Deeply involved in the investigation of the 1967 Apollo 1 fire, Shea suffered from stress. He was moved to an alternative position in Washington and left NASA shortly afterwards. From 1968 until 1990, he worked as a senior manager at Raytheon in Lexington, Massachusetts, and thereafter became an adjunct professor of aeronautics and astronautics at MIT. While Shea served as a consultant for NASA on the redesign of the International Space Station in 1993, he was forced to resign from the position due to health issues. He died in 1999.

== Early life and education ==
Shea was born September 5, 1925, and grew up in the Bronx, the eldest son in a working-class Irish Catholic family. His father worked as a mechanic on the New York City Subway. As a child, Shea had no interest in engineering; he was a good runner and hoped to become a professional athlete. He attended a Catholic high school and graduated when he was only sixteen. On graduating in 1943, Shea enlisted in the U.S. Navy and enrolled in a program that would put him through college. He began his studies at Dartmouth College, later moving to MIT and finally to the University of Michigan, where he would remain until he earned his doctorate in 1955. In 1946, he was commissioned as an ensign in the Navy and received a Bachelor of Science degree in Mathematics. Shea went on to earn a MSc (1950) and a Ph.D. (1955) in Engineering Mechanics from the University of Michigan. While obtaining his doctorate, Shea simultaneously taught at the university and had a job at Bell Labs.

== Systems engineer ==
After receiving his doctorate, Shea took a position at Bell Labs in Whippany, New Jersey. There he first worked as systems engineer on the hybrid radio-inertial guidance system of the Titan I intercontinental ballistic missile (ICBM), and then as the development and program manager on the inertial guidance system of the Titan II ICBM. Shea's specialty was systems engineering, a new type of engineering developed in the 1950s that focused on the management and integration of large-scale projects, turning the work of engineers and contractors into one functioning whole. He played a significant role in the Titan I project; as George Mueller writes, "[H]e contributed a considerable amount of engineering innovation and project management skill and was directly responsible for the successful development of this pioneering guidance system." In addition to Shea's technical abilities, it quickly became obvious he was also an excellent manager of people. Known for his quick intellect, he also endeared himself to his subordinates through small eccentricities such as his fondness for bad puns and his habit of wearing red socks to important meetings.

During the critical days of the Titan project, Shea moved into the plant, sleeping on a cot in his office so as to be available at all hours if he was needed. Having brought in the project on time and on budget, Shea established a reputation in the aerospace community. In 1961, he was offered and accepted a position with Space Technology Laboratories, a division of TRW Inc., where he continued to work on ballistic missile systems.

== NASA career ==
In December 1961, NASA invited Shea to interview for the position of deputy director of the Office of Manned Space Flight (OMSF). D. Brainerd Holmes, Director of the OMSF, had been searching for a deputy who could offer expertise in systems engineering, someone with the technical abilities to supervise the Apollo program as a whole. Shea was recommended by one of Holmes' advisors, who had worked with him at Bell Labs. Although Shea had worked at Space Technology Labs for less than a year, he was captivated by the challenge offered by the NASA position. "I could see they needed good people in the space program," he later said, "and I was kind of cocky in those days."

=== Lunar orbit rendezvous ===
When Shea was hired by NASA, President John F. Kennedy's commitment to landing men on the Moon was still only seven months old, and many of the major decisions that shaped the Apollo program were yet to be made. Foremost among these was the mode NASA would use to land on the Moon. When Shea first began to consider the issue in 1962, most NASA engineers and managers—including Wernher von Braun, the director of the Marshall Space Flight Center—favored either a direct ascent approach, where the Apollo spacecraft would land on the Moon and return to the Earth as one unit, or Earth orbit rendezvous, where the spacecraft would be assembled while still in orbit around the Earth. However, dissenters such as John Houbolt, a Langley engineer, favored an approach then considered to be more risky: lunar orbit rendezvous, in which two spacecraft would be used. A command/service module (CSM) would remain in orbit around the Moon, while a lunar module would land on the Moon and return to dock with the CSM in lunar orbit, then be discarded.

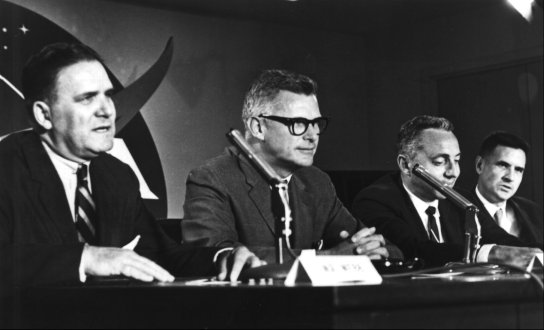
The lunar orbit rendezvous decision is announced at a NASA press conference in July 1962. Joe Shea is at the far right.

In November 1961, John Houbolt had sent a paper advocating lunar orbit rendezvous (LOR) to Robert Seamans, the deputy administrator of NASA. As Shea remembered, "Seamans gave a copy of Houbolt's letter to Brainerd Holmes [the director of OMSF]. Holmes put the letter on my desk and said: Figure it out." Shea became involved in the lunar orbit rendezvous decision as a result of this letter. While he began with a mild preference for earth orbit rendezvous, Shea "prided himself", according to space historians Charles Murray and Catherine Cox, "on going wherever the data took him". In this case, the data took him to NASA's Langley Research Center in Hampton, Virginia, where he met with John Houbolt and with the Space Task Group, and became convinced LOR was an option worth considering.

Shea's task now became to shepherd NASA to a firm decision on the issue. This task was complicated by the fact that he had to build consensus between NASA's different centers—most notably the Manned Spacecraft Center in Houston headed by Robert Gilruth, and the Marshall Space Flight Center in Huntsville, Alabama, headed by Wernher von Braun. Relations between the two centers were not good, and it was a major milestone in the progress of the Apollo program when von Braun and his team finally came to accept the superiority of the LOR concept. NASA announced its decision at a press conference on July 11, 1962, only six months after Shea had joined NASA. Space historian James Hansen concludes Shea "played a major role in supporting Houbolt's ideas and making the ... decision in favor of LOR", while his former colleague George Mueller writes "it is a tribute to Joe's logic and leadership that he was able to build a consensus within the centers at a time when they were autonomous."

During his time at the OMSF, Shea helped resolve many of the other inevitable engineering debates and conflicts that cropped up during the development of the Apollo spacecraft. In May 1963, he formed a Panel Review Board, bringing together representatives of the many committees that aimed to coordinate work between NASA centers. Under Shea's leadership, this coordination became far more efficient.

=== Program manager ===
In October 1963, Shea became the new manager of the Apollo Spacecraft Program Office (ASPO) in Houston. Although technically a demotion, this new position gave Shea the responsibility for managing the design and construction of the Apollo command and lunar modules. Of particular concern to Shea was the performance of North American Aviation, the contractor responsible for the command module. He later recounted:

I do not have a high opinion of North American and their motives in the early days. Their first program manager was a first-class jerk. ... There were spots of good guys, but it was just an ineffective organization. They had no discipline, no concept of change control.

It was Shea's job to bring engineering to NASA's management of its contractors. Any change to the design of the Apollo spacecraft would need to receive approval from him. He oversaw and ran the program using a management tool he had devised—a 100+ page looseleaf notebook, which was put together for him every week, summarizing all the important things that had taken place and decisions that needed to be made. Presented with the notebook on Thursday evenings, Shea would study and annotate it over the weekend with questions, instructions, and decisions. This tool allowed him to keep track of a complex and ever-expanding program.

Shea's relationship with the engineers at North American was a difficult one. While Shea blamed North American's management for the continuing difficulties in the development of the command module, project leader Harrison Storms felt NASA itself was far from blameless. It had delayed making key design decisions, and persisted in making significant changes to the design once construction had begun. While Shea did his part in attempting to control the change requests, Storms felt Shea did not understand or sympathize with the inevitable problems involved in the day-to-day work of manufacturing.

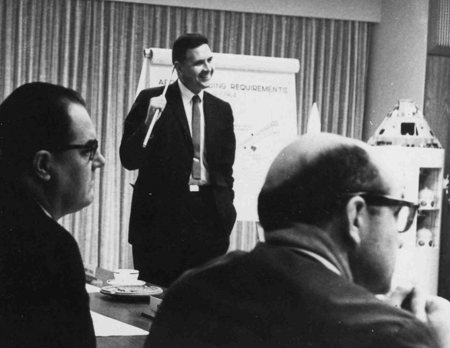
Shea at an engineering meeting during the Apollo program

Shea was a controversial figure even at the Manned Spacecraft Center. Not having been at Langley with the Space Task Group, he was considered an "outsider" by officials such as flight director Chris Kraft, who recalled "the animosity between my people and Shea's was intense". Relations between Shea and other NASA centers were even more uneasy. As the deputy director of OMSF, Shea had sought to extend the authority of NASA Headquarters over the fiercely independent NASA centers. This was particularly problematic when it came to the Marshall Space Flight Center, which had developed its own culture under Wernher von Braun. Von Braun's philosophy of engineering differed from Shea's, taking a consensual rather than top-down approach. As one historian recounts, von Braun felt "Shea had 'bitten off' too much work and was going to 'wreck' the centers engineering capabilities."

The friction between Shea and Marshall, which had begun when Shea was at OMSF, continued after he moved to his new position. He became deeply involved in supporting George Mueller's effort to impose the idea of "all up" testing of the Saturn V rocket on the unwilling engineers at Marshall. Von Braun's approach to engineering was a conservative one, emphasizing the incremental testing of components. But the tight schedule of the Apollo program did not allow for this slow and careful process. What Mueller and Shea proposed was to test the Saturn V as one unit on its very first flight, and Marshall only reluctantly came to accept this approach in late 1963. When later asked how he and Mueller had managed to sell the idea to von Braun, Shea responded "we just told him that's the way it's going to be, finally."

Shea's role in resolving differences within NASA, and between NASA and its contractors, placed him in a position where criticism was inevitable. However, even Shea's critics could not help but respect his engineering and management skills. Everyone who knew Shea considered him to be a brilliant engineer, and his time as manager at ASPO only served to solidify a reputation formed during his time on the Titan project. Of Shea's work in the mid-1960s, Murray and Cox write "these were Joe Shea's glory days, and whatever the swirl of opinions about this gifted, enigmatic man, he was taking an effort that had been foundering and driving it forward." Shea's work also won wider attention, bringing him public recognition that approached that accorded to Wernher von Braun or Chris Kraft. Kraft had appeared on the cover of Time in 1965; Time planned to offer Shea the same honor in February 1967, the month in which the first crewed Apollo mission was scheduled to occur.

=== Apollo 1 fire ===
==== Background ====
Problems with the Apollo command module continued through the testing phase. The review meeting for the first spacecraft intended for a crewed mission took place on August 19, 1966. One issue of concern was the amount of Velcro in the cabin, a potential fire hazard in the pure-oxygen atmosphere of the spacecraft, if there were to be a spark. Shea later recounted:

And so the issue was brought up at the acceptance of the spacecraft, a long drawn-out discussion. I got a little annoyed, and I said, "Look, there's no way there's going to be a fire in that spacecraft unless there's a spark or the astronauts bring cigarettes aboard. We're not going to let them smoke." Well, I then issued orders at that meeting, "Go clean up the spacecraft. Be sure that all the fire rules are obeyed."

Although the spacecraft passed its review, the crew finished the meeting by presenting Shea with a picture of the three of them seated around a model of the capsule, heads bowed in prayer. The inscription was: "It isn't that we don't trust you, Joe, but this time we've decided to go over your head."

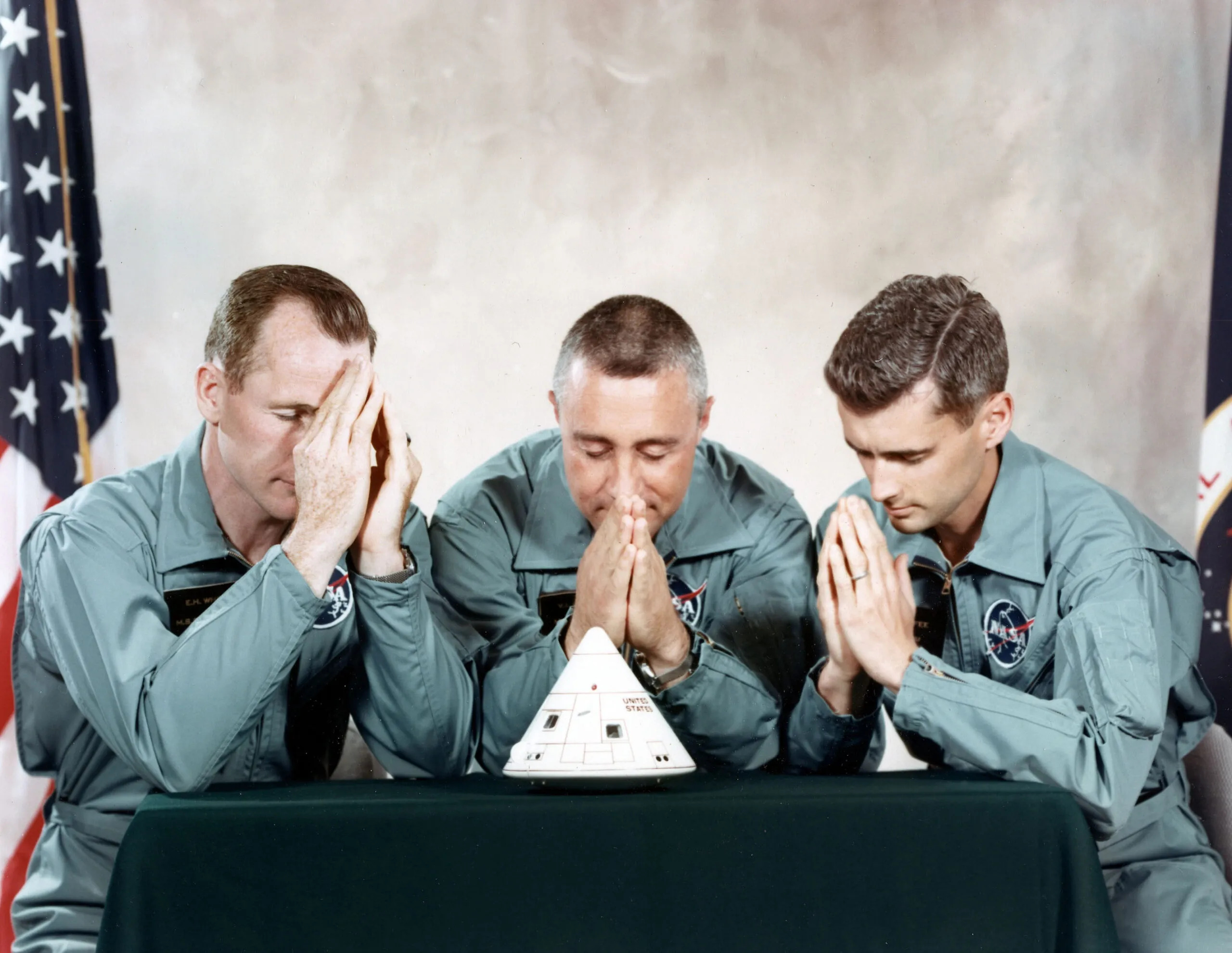
The Apollo 1 astronauts presented this picture to Joe Shea as a joke before the fire.

On January 25, 1967, the Apollo 1 crew began a series of countdown tests in the spacecraft on the pad at Cape Kennedy. Although Shea had ordered his staff to direct North American to take action on the issue of flammable materials in the cabin, he had not supervised the issue directly, and little if any action had been taken. During pad testing, the spacecraft suffered a number of technical problems, including broken and static-filled communications. Wally Schirra, the backup commander for the mission, suggested Shea should go through the countdown test in the spacecraft with the crew in order to experience first-hand the issues they were facing. Although he seriously considered the idea, it proved to be unworkable because of the difficulties of hooking up a fourth communications loop for Shea. The hatch would have to be left open in order to run the extra wires out, and leaving the hatch open would make it impossible to run the emergency egress test scheduled for the end of the day on the 27th. As Shea later told the press, joining the crew for the test would have been "highly irregular".

A "plugs-out" spacecraft test, simulating the launch countdown, took place on January 27. While Shea was in Florida for the beginning of the test, he decided to leave before it concluded. He arrived back at his office in Houston at about 5:30 p.m. CST. At 5:31 p.m. CST (6:31 p.m. EST) a massive fire broke out in the Apollo command module. Unable to escape, the three astronauts inside the spacecraft, Gus Grissom, Ed White and Roger Chaffee, were killed.

==== Investigation ====
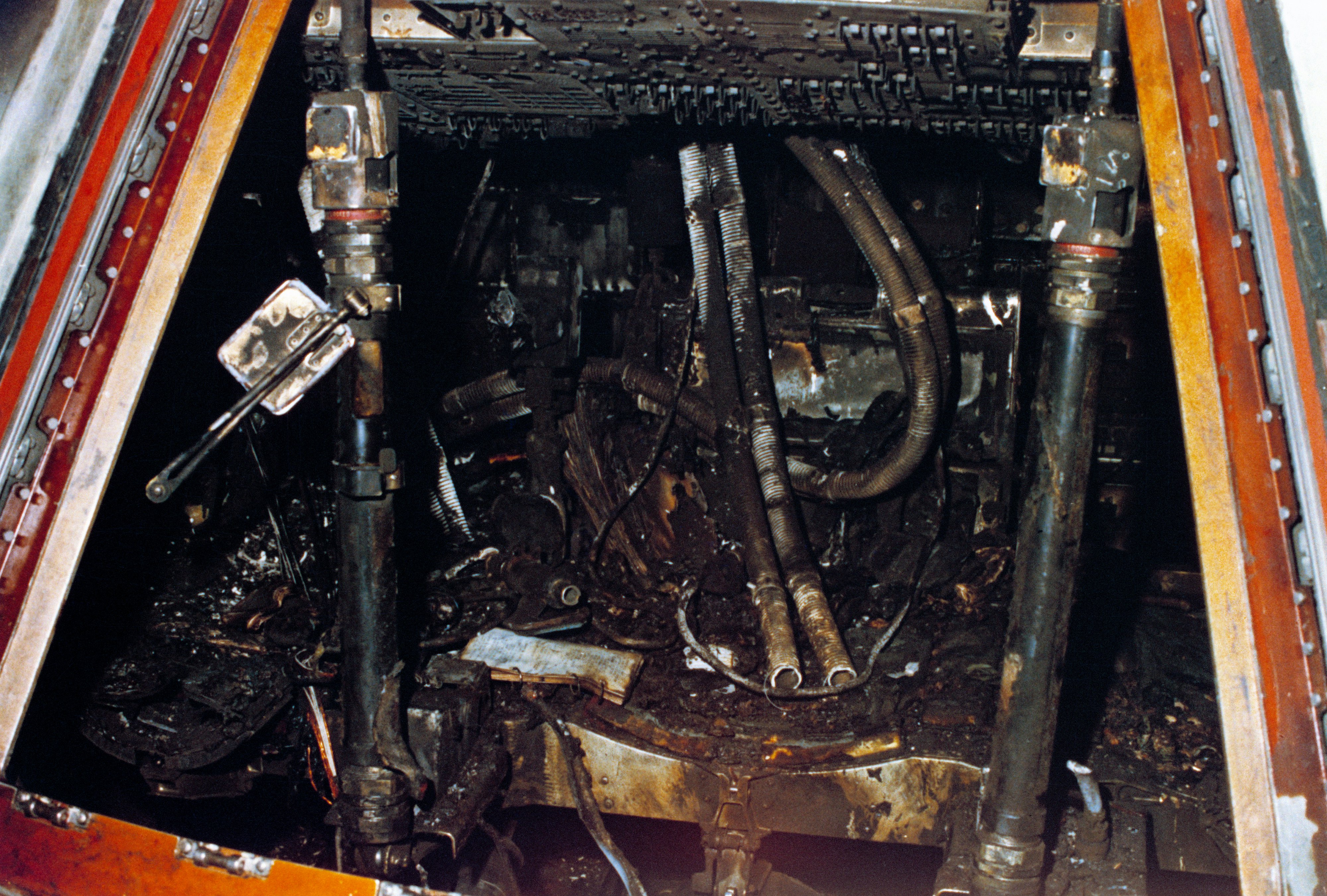
The interior of the Apollo 1 capsule after the fire

Immediately after the fire, Shea and his ASPO colleagues at Houston boarded a NASA plane to the Kennedy Space Center. They landed at about 1:00 a.m., only five hours after the fire had broken out. At a meeting that morning with Robert Gilruth, George Mueller and George Low, Shea helped to determine the individuals who would be on the NASA review board looking into the causes of the fire. Additionally, he persuaded George Mueller, head of NASA's Office of Manned Space Flight, to allow him to act as Mueller's deputy in Florida, supervising the progress of the investigation.

Named to the advisory group chosen to support the review board, Shea threw himself into the investigation, working 80-hour weeks. Although the precise source of ignition was never found, it soon became clear an electrical short somewhere in the command module had started the fire, likely sparked by a chafed wire. What was less clear was where the responsibility lay. NASA engineers often pointed out what they saw as shoddy workmanship by North American Aviation. North American executives blamed NASA for its decision (over their objections) to pressurize the command module with pure oxygen to a pressure far above the level needed in space, in which almost any material—including Velcro, with which the cabin was filled—would instantly burst into flames if exposed to a spark. Shea remained haunted by the feeling that he, personally, was responsible for the deaths of the three astronauts. For years after the fire, he displayed the portrait given to him by the Apollo 1 crew in the front hallway of his own home.

==== Breakdown ====
The pressure of the investigation took a psychological toll on Shea. He had trouble sleeping and began resorting to barbiturates and alcohol in order to help himself cope. Shea was not the only NASA employee who found the aftermath of the fire difficult to handle: Robert Seamans wrote "key people from Houston would fly up to Washington to testify and literally sob all the way on the plane", and a man who worked under Shea suffered a nervous breakdown and was reportedly taken to a mental hospital in a straitjacket. A few weeks after the fire, Shea's colleagues began to notice he too was behaving erratically. Chris Kraft, whose father had suffered from schizophrenia, later related Shea's behavior in one meeting:

Joe Shea got up and started calmly with a report on the state of the investigation. But within a minute, he was rambling, and in another thirty seconds, he was incoherent. I looked at him and saw my father, in the grip of dementia praecox. It was horrifying and fascinating at the same time.

NASA administrator James Webb became increasingly worried about Shea's mental state. Specifically, he was concerned Shea might not be able to deal with the hostile questioning he would receive from the congressional inquiry into the Apollo 1 fire. Senator Walter Mondale had accused NASA engineers of "criminal negligence" with regard to the design and construction of the Apollo command module, and it was expected Shea would be in the firing line. In March, Webb sent Robert Seamans and Charles Berry, NASA's head physician, to speak with Shea and ask him to take an extended voluntary leave of absence. This would, they hoped, protect him from being called to testify. A press release had already been prepared, but Shea refused, threatening to resign rather than take leave. As a compromise, he agreed to meet with a psychiatrist and to abide by an independent assessment of his psychological fitness. Yet this approach to removing Shea from his position was also unsuccessful. One of his friends later recounted: "The psychiatrists came back saying, 'He's so smart, he's so intelligent!' Here Joe was, ready to kill himself, but he could still outsmart the psychiatrists."

==== Reassignment ====
At that point, Shea's superiors felt forced to take a more direct approach. On April 7, it was announced Shea would be transferred to NASA headquarters in Washington, D.C. to serve as George Mueller's deputy in the Office of Manned Space Flight. He was replaced as chief of the Apollo Spacecraft Program Office by George Low. While Shea had already acted as Mueller's de facto deputy in Florida during the investigation, the reality of this permanent posting was very different. When Shea's reassignment was announced, one of his friends gave an anonymous interview to Time magazine in which he said "if Joe stays in Washington, it'll be a promotion. If he leaves in three or four months, you'll know this move amounted to being fired."

Shea accepted the reassignment reluctantly, feeling "it was as if NASA was trying to hide me from the Congress for what I might have said". Once in the job, he grew increasingly dissatisfied with a posting he considered to be a "non-job", later commenting "I don't understand why, after everything I had done for the program ... I was only one that was removed. That's the end of the program for me." Only six months after being fired, and some two months after taking his new position, Shea left NASA in order to become a vice president at the Polaroid Corporation in Waltham, Massachusetts. He was never called to testify before the congressional inquiry into the fire.

== Post-NASA career ==
In 1968, Shea took a position at Raytheon in Lexington, Massachusetts. He would remain with the company until his retirement in 1990, serving as senior vice president for Engineering from 1981 through 1990. After leaving Raytheon, Shea became an adjunct professor of aeronautics and astronautics at MIT.

In February 1993, NASA administrator Daniel Goldin appointed Shea to the chairmanship of a technical review board convened to oversee the redesign of the troubled International Space Station. However, Shea was hospitalized shortly after his appointment. By April he was well enough to attend a meeting where the design team formally presented the preliminary results of its studies, but his behavior at the meeting again called his capacities into question. The Washington Post reported:

Shea made a rambling, sometimes barely audible two-hour presentation that left many of those present speculating about his ability to do the job. A longtime friend said, "That's not the real Joe Shea. He is normally incisive and well-organized."

On the day following the meeting, Shea offered his resignation, becoming instead a special advisor to Goldin. NASA reported he had resigned for health reasons. However, The Scientist offered a different interpretation, quoting sources who speculated the bluntness of his speech, including criticisms of Goldin, may have been controversial in NASA circles. Shea died on February 14, 1999, at his home in Weston, Massachusetts. He was survived by his wife Carol, six daughters, and one son.

== See also ==
- From the Earth to the Moon, HBO miniseries where Shea is portrayed by Kevin Pollak.

== Sources ==
- Ertel, Ivan D.; Newkirk, Roland W.; Brooks, Courtney G. (1978). The Apollo Spacecraft: A Chronology, Volume IV (PDF). Washington, D.C.: NASA.
- Gray, Mike (1992). Angle of Attack: Harrison Storms and the Race to the Moon. New York: Penguin Books. ISBN 0-14-023280-X.
- Hansen, James R. (1995). Enchanted Rendezvous: John C. Houbolt and the Genesis of the Lunar-Orbit Rendezvous Concept (PDF). Washington, D.C.: NASA.
- Kraft, Christopher C., Jr. (2001). Flight: My Life in Mission Control. New York: Dutton. ISBN 0-525-94571-7.
- Mueller, George (2002). "Joseph F. Shea". Memorial Tributes: National Academy of Engineering. 10. National Academies Press: 210–214. ISBN 0-309-59422-7.
- Murray, Charles; Cox, Catherine Bly (1989). Apollo: The Race to the Moon. New York: Simon and Schuster. ISBN 0-671-61101-1.
- "Shea, Joseph F." (PDF). NASA Johnson Space Center Oral History Project Biographical Data Sheet. July 16, 1998. Archived from the original (PDF) on March 9, 2008.
- Kelly, Michelle (August 26, 1998). "Shea, Joseph F." (PDF). NASA Johnson Space Center Oral History Project. Archived from the original (PDF) on March 9, 2008.
- Kelly, Michelle (November 23, 1998). "Shea, Joseph F." (PDF). NASA Johnson Space Center Oral History Project. Archived from the original (PDF) on March 9, 2008.
- O'Toole, Thomas; Schefter, Jim (July 15, 1979). "The Bumpy Road that Led Man to the Moon". The Washington Post. p. E1.
- Rosen, Herb (November 1994). "Apollo 11 Remembered". Aerospace America. p. B7.
- Sato, Yasushi (2005). "Local Engineering and Systems Engineering: Cultural Conflict at NASA's Marshall Space Flight Center, 1960–1966". Technology and Culture. 46 (July 2005). Society for the History of Technology: 561–583. doi:10.1353/tech.2005.0145. S2CID 109592653.
- Sawyer, Kathy (February 27, 1993). "NASA Picks Manager to Cut Expenditures on Space Station". The Washington Post. p. A2 – via Factiva.
- Sawyer, Kathy (April 23, 1993). "Space Station Redesign Chief Steps Down". The Washington Post. p. A15 – via Factiva.
- Seamans, Robert Channing, Jr. (1996). Aiming at Targets (PDF). Washington, D.C.: NASA. ISBN 0160489075.
- Swenson, Loyd S. Jr.; Brooks, Courtney G.; Grimwood, James M. (1979). Chariots for Apollo: A History of Manned Lunar Spacecraft. Washington, D.C.: NASA.
- "How Soon the Moon?". Time. April 14, 1967.
- "Joseph F. Shea, 72". The Boston Globe. February 16, 1999 – via Newspapers.com.
- "2 Space Aides Decided Not to Join Apollo Test". The New York Times. United Press International. February 12, 1967. p. 32.
- Veggeberg, Scott (May 17, 1993). "President To Space Station: Cut The Fat Or Face the Ax". The Scientist. 7 (10): 3.
