= First Man: The Life of Neil A. Armstrong =

Official biography of Neil Armstrong

- Cover of First Man: The Life of Neil A. Armstrong
- Author: James R. Hansen
- Language: English
- Subject: Neil A. Armstrong
- Publisher: Simon & Schuster
- Publication date: 2005
- Publication place: United States
- Media type: Print
- Pages: 768 pp
- ISBN: 0-7432-5631-X
- OCLC: 60743246
- Dewey Decimal: 629.45/0092 B 22
- LC Class: TL789.85.A75 H36 2005

First Man: The Life of Neil A. Armstrong is the authorized biography of Neil Armstrong, the astronaut who became the first human to walk on the Moon, on July 20, 1969. The book was written by James R. Hansen and was first published in 2005 by Simon & Schuster. The book describes Armstrong's involvement in the United States space program (culminating in the historic Apollo 11 mission), and details his personal life and upbringing.

The book has received a warm reception from several individuals associated with astronomy and the promotion of spaceflight. Examples include the broadcast journalist Walter Cronkite, and the English astronomer and public intellectual Sir Patrick Moore.

The book was adapted into the 2018 film First Man.

== Development ==
Academic and author James Hansen is also known for serving as a professor of history at Auburn University in Alabama. He additionally serves as director of that institution's Honors College. The writing process began in October 1999, when Hansen first wrote to Armstrong asking if he could author the book. At first, Armstrong told him that he was too busy, and the astronaut mentioned how he had already turned down several previous offers from well-known authors such as Stephen Ambrose and James A. Michener. Hansen persisted, sending what he described as a "goody box" of his work. One of the items included was the author's well-received biography, titled From the Ground Up, of seminal aviation pioneer Fred Weick.

Armstrong felt impressed with the style of Hansen's work. In June 2002, Armstrong and Hansen signed a formal agreement. Two months later, Armstrong signed an official letter for Hansen that said Hansen had his full support and encouraged others to provide what he needed to write a book. While numerous publications had described aspects of Armstrong's long career and personal endeavors, to varying degrees, First Man became the first official book to detail the astronaut's life, including much information both before and after the Apollo program.

After questioning as to why, after years of reluctance, he had finally consented to a full biography, Armstrong replied simply: "It was time."

== Contents and details ==
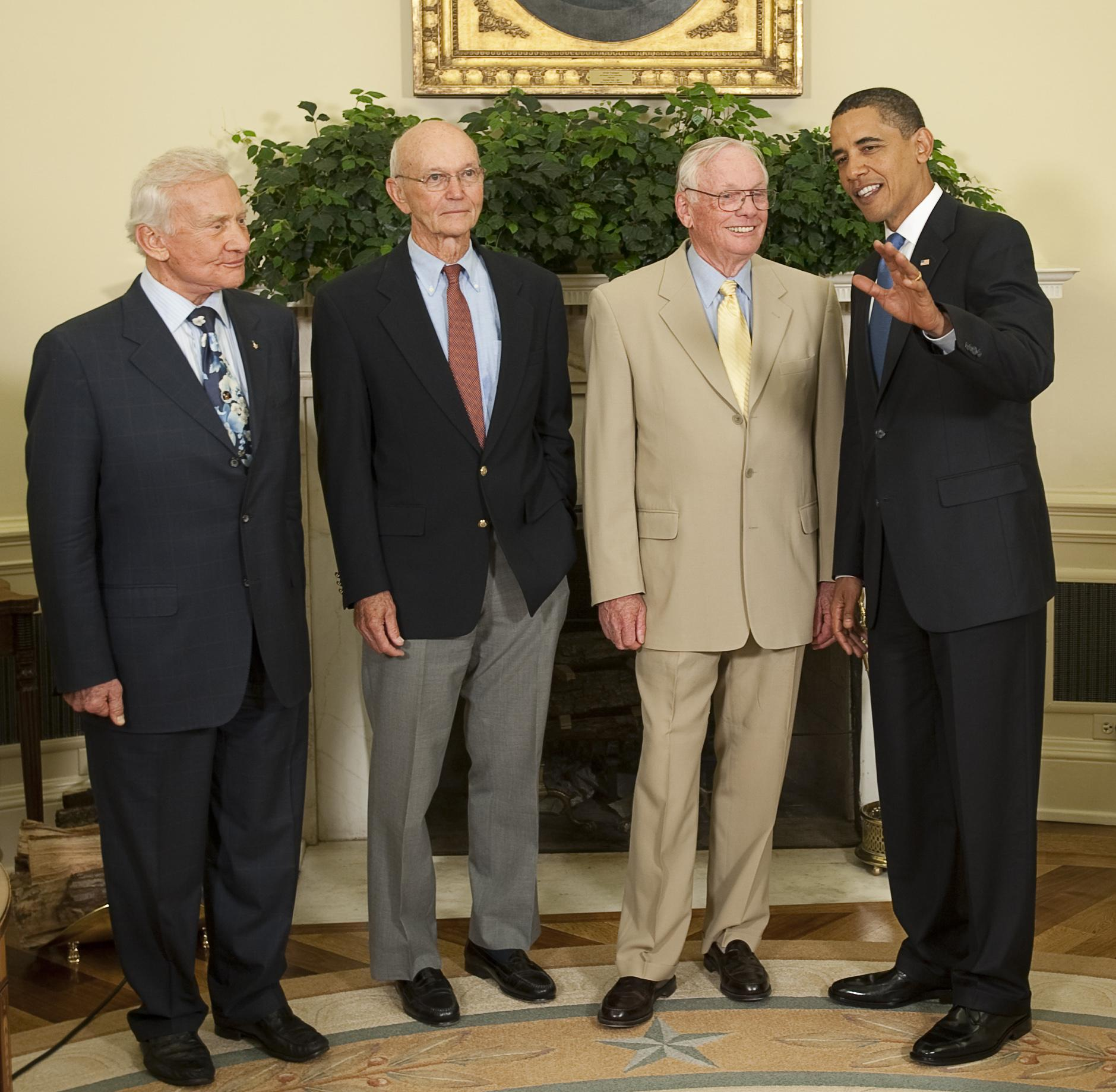
President Barack Obama converses with Armstrong (right) alongside the astronaut's Apollo 11 colleagues Michael Collins (center) and Edwin "Buzz" Aldrin Jr. (left) in the Oval Office, the men meeting for the 40th anniversary of the lunar landing.

The book describes Armstrong's early life as pleasant and broadly conventional. As a young man, he became increasingly fascinated by aircraft and flying, and earned his pilot's licence before learning to drive an automobile. Armstrong's father is quoted as saying his son "never had a girl" and "didn't need a car" but simply "had... to get out to that airport."

The young Armstrong became a naval aviator. Management of the National Aeronautics and Space Administration (NASA) took an interest in Armstrong's combination of calmness and personal skill, coupled with his above-average intellect. Although contrasting somewhat with many of his colleagues, the Apollo 11 crew wound up as "amiable strangers", he attracted widespread respect. The fact that Armstrong got chosen to be "first down" on the lunar surface was a surprise, with astronaut Edwin "Buzz" Aldrin Jr. being expected to get priority. The mission itself proceeded spectacularly well, and Armstrong delivered his famous line: "That's one small step for a man, one giant leap for mankind."

The historic nature of the event meant that Armstrong had to adapt to being one of the most famous men on the planet, a peculiar situation which he found challenging. Given the gravity of the Apollo program and the sacrifices made for the lunar mission to succeed, Armstrong felt determined to make sure that his status as the "first man on the Moon" was never exploited for anyone's petty gain. Interested in spreading his knowledge to younger generations, he eschewed a celebrity status by serving as a lecturer in engineering at the University of Cincinnati. While shying away from the personal spotlight, as an individual, he spent decades advancing the cause of further spaceflight by providing advice to those at NASA, keeping in close touch with multiple figures.

== Reception ==
English astronomer and public intellectual Sir Patrick Moore praised the book. Writing for the publication Times Higher Education, Moore stated that he considered the work an "outstanding success", finding it "immaculately researched and is packed with detail" while still being "written in a way that will appeal to readers of all kinds". He concluded, "This is an important book and should be in every scientific library."

American journalist Walter Cronkite lauded First Man as well, remarking:

Even if you think you know everything about Neil Armstrong and America's historic mission to be the first to land men on the Moon, this remarkable book by Dr. James Hansen contributes a host of fascinating new insights into not only the character of Apollo 11's enigmatic commander but also into the nature of the spacefaring enterprise itself. It is a book for all time.

== Film adaptation ==
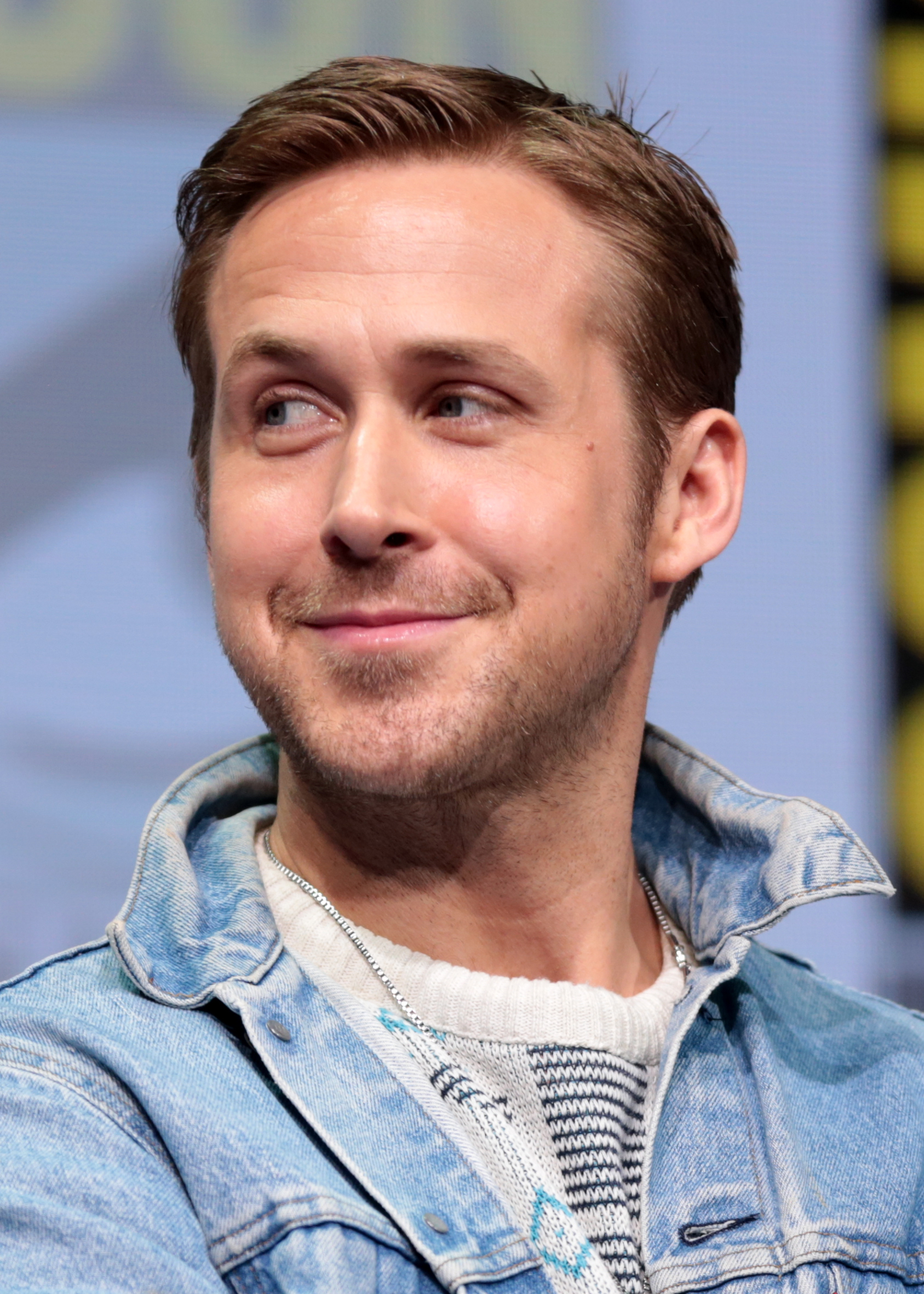
Actor Ryan Gosling (pictured here in 2017) stars as Neil Armstrong in the film adaption of First Man

In early 2003, actor-director Clint Eastwood and production people at the studio Warner Bros. bought the film rights to First Man. Eastwood had previously directed as well as starred in the 2000 space-themed movie Space Cowboys, though he stated that he would likely not appear on camera in First Man. However, the project wound up in development hell despite significant interest. Armstrong himself died on August 25, 2012, before any actual filming took place. Universal Pictures and DreamWorks Pictures ultimately took up the First Man project in the mid-2010s. Damien Chazelle, a director receiving critical acclaim for his work in 2016's La La Land, signed onto the film's production. Actor Ryan Gosling, who starred in La La Land, joined as well. Given his role as the book's author, Hansen was attached to co-produce the movie. The film also called First Man, was released in 2018.

== Versions ==
The first edition was published in hardcover format at a total length of 784 pages in October 2005, later followed by a paperback edition that was 770 pages in length. An abridged audio recording of the book, as read by Boyd Gaines, was released simultaneously by Simon & Schuster Audio with a running time of just over nine hours.

A few weeks prior to the release of the film 13 years later, an abridged version of the book was issued in trade paperback format. The abridged edition was 464 pages in length, and had five fewer chapters than the previous releases, consolidating several chapters covering the front end of Armstrong's life and slightly reorganizing the grouping of the chapters. An extended audio recording of the book, as read by Jeremy Bobb, was released to coincide with the movie's release, this version having a running time of sixteen-and-a-half hours.

== See also ==
- Carrying the Fire: An Astronaut's Journeys, the autobiography of the Gemini 10 and Apollo 11 astronaut Michael Collins
- First on the Moon: A Voyage with Neil Armstrong, Michael Collins and Edwin E. Aldrin, Jr. about the Apollo 11 flight written by the spacecraft crew in 1970 in collaboration with Gene Farmer and Dora Jane Hamblin
- A Man on the Moon: The Voyages of the Apollo Astronauts, a 1994 book about the Apollo program by Andrew Chaikin.
- One Giant Leap: The Impossible Mission That Flew Us to the Moon, a 2019 book about the Apollo program by Charles Fishman.
