= One Giant Leap (book) =

2019 book on the Apollo program

One Giant Leap: The Impossible Mission That Flew Us to the Moon
- Author: Charles Fishman
- Language: English
- Subject: Apollo program
- Genre: History, nonfiction
- Publisher: Simon & Schuster
- Publication date: 2019
- Publication place: USA
- Pages: 480
- ISBN: 978-1501106293

One Giant Leap: The Impossible Mission That Flew Us to the Moon is a 2019 nonfiction book by journalist Charles Fishman, about the Apollo program, that focuses on thousands of people who worked on it.

== Background ==
[The U.S.] didn't have a spaceship that could fly to the moon. We didn't have a rocket that could launch to the moon. We didn't have a computer small enough or powerful enough to do the navigation necessary to get people to the moon. We didn't have space food.

— Charles Fishman

Fishman wrote the book concentrating not on the biographies of Neil Armstrong or Buzz Aldrin, but writing about ordinary people and often overlooked scientists and engineers who worked on the project. In his review, Robert Schaefer, a research engineer at MIT Haystack Observatory, writes that "between 1961 and 1966, 20,000 companies and a half a million workers were designing, building, or assembling pieces of Apollo ... if Apollo were a corporation, it would have been bigger than every Fortune 500 corporation except for GM." Fishman counted the numbers as "410,000 men and women at some 20,000 different companies [who] contributed to the effort". Among the scientists are Charles Stark Draper, the head of MIT Instrumentation Lab, that designed the Apollo Guidance Computer (AGC), Bill Tindall, "the talented writer and orbital mechanics 'genius' from the Langley Research Center", and John Houbolt, NASA engineer who advocated for the lunar orbit rendezvous (LOR).

Fishman writes that "Apollo didn't usher in the Space Age, but it did usher in the Digital Age. It helped lay the foundation of the technology that created the digital revolution, and it helped give Americans a sense of excitement and anticipation about the Digital Age ... that had been completely missing before the 1960s began."

== Reception ==
The book received positive reviews. National Space Society review writes that "As NASA prepares to return astronauts to the Moon within the next decade ... this book acts as a reminder about what is required to achieve epic results", while Kirkus Reviews calls the book "a fresh, enthusiastic history of the moon mission".

In his review for the Washington Post, Mark Whitaker praised the book as "meticulously researched and absorbingly written". He notes that Fishman "skips retelling the personal stories of Armstrong, Aldrin and Michael Collins".

Robert Schaefer notes that "Fishman is a really, really good storyteller, and One Giant Leap would make a fantastic audio book". He writes that the book gave a good understanding "of America as it was and how it changed with the Apollo mission". Schaefer concludes his review writing that "This reviewer has but one complaint, that even at 480 pages, One Giant Leap could and should have been even longer, with more on the Mercury and Gemini missions preceding Apollo, more on the Saturn V, more on each Apollo astronaut, and more on their discoveries."

== See also ==
- "One small step", 1969 title namesake quote by Neil Armstrong
- First on the Moon (1970 Armstrong, Collins, and Aldrin book)
- Carrying the Fire 1974 autobiography of Apollo 11 astronaut Michael Collins
- A Man on the Moon The Voyages of the Apollo Astronauts, 1994 book
- Moon Shot, 1994 book by Alan Shepard
- First Man: The Life of Neil A. Armstrong, 2005 biography
