= We choose to go to the Moon =

1962 speech by John F. Kennedy

Address at Rice University on the Nation's Space Effort
- Part of Cold War
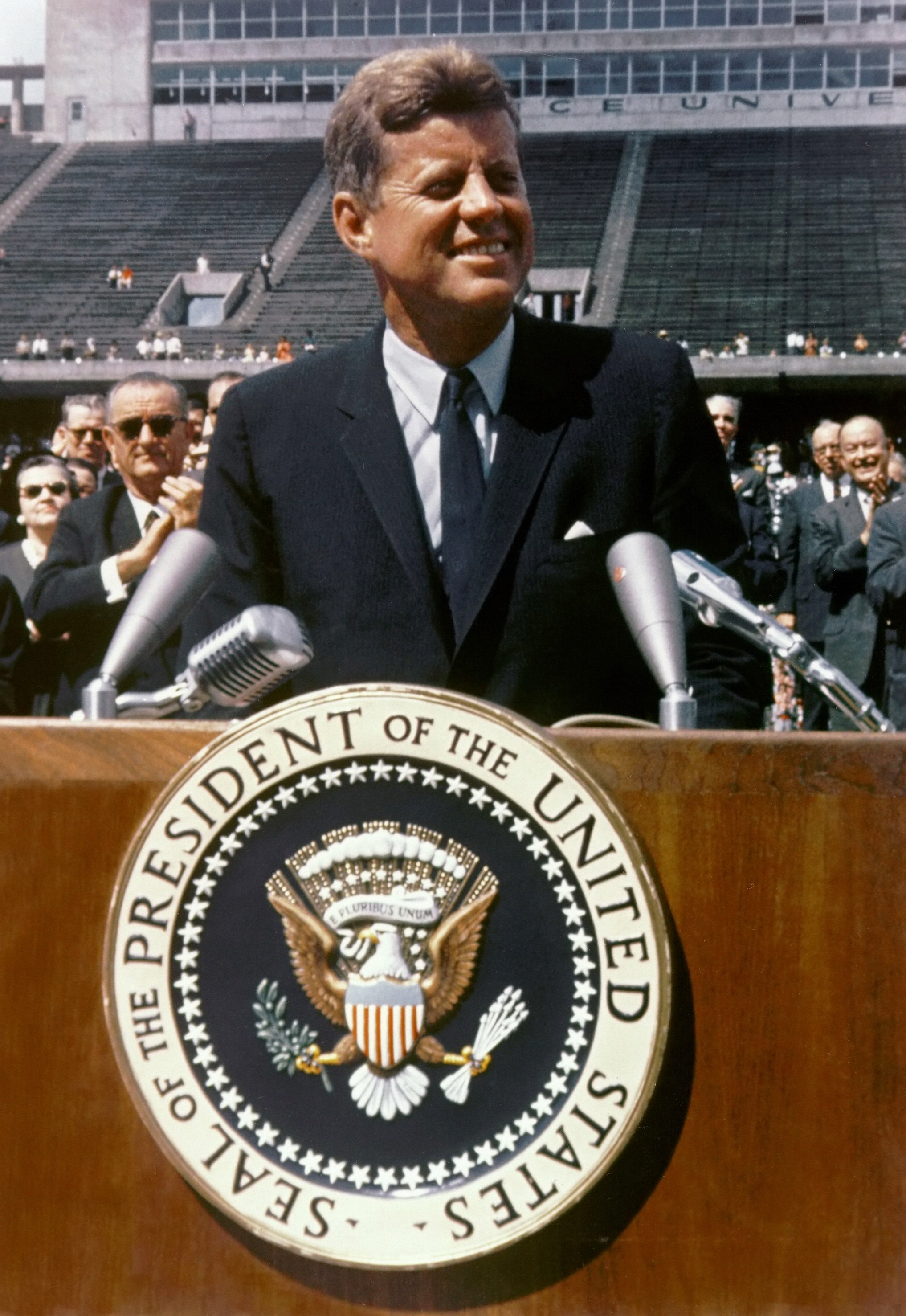
- Date: September 12, 1962
- Venue: Rice University
- Type: Speech
- Motive: Crewed Moon landing program
- Participants: President John F. Kennedy
- The full text of the speech at Wikisource

The Address at Rice University on the Nation's Space Effort (commonly known by the sentence in the middle of the speech "We choose to go to the Moon") was a speech on September 12, 1962, by John F. Kennedy, the president of the United States. Its aim was to bolster public support for his proposal to land a man on the Moon and return him safely back to Earth before the end of the decade. Kennedy gave the speech, largely written by presidential advisor and speechwriter Ted Sorensen, to a large crowd at Rice University Stadium in Houston, Texas.

In his speech, Kennedy characterized space as a new frontier, invoking the pioneer spirit that dominated American folklore. He infused the speech with a sense of urgency and destiny, and emphasized the freedom enjoyed by Americans to choose their destiny rather than have it chosen for them. Although he called for competition with the Soviet Union, the president also proposed making the Moon landing a joint project. The speech resonated widely, although there was disquiet about the cost and value of the Moon-landing effort. Kennedy's goal was realized posthumously, on July 20, 1969, with the Apollo program's successful Apollo 11 mission.

== Background ==
When John F. Kennedy became the president of the United States in January 1961, many Americans perceived that the United States was losing the Space Race with the Soviet Union, which had successfully launched the first artificial satellite, Sputnik 1, almost four years earlier. The perception increased when, on April 12, 1961, Russian cosmonaut Yuri Gagarin became the first man in space before the U.S. could launch its first Project Mercury astronaut. American prestige was further damaged by the Bay of Pigs fiasco five days later.

Convinced of the political need for an achievement which would decisively demonstrate America's space superiority, Kennedy asked his vice president, Lyndon B. Johnson, in his role as chairman of the National Aeronautics and Space Council, to identify such an achievement. He specifically asked him to investigate whether the United States could beat the Soviet Union in putting a laboratory in space, or orbiting a man around the Moon, or landing a man on the Moon, and to find out what such a project would cost. Johnson consulted with officials of the National Aeronautics and Space Administration (NASA).

Its new administrator, James E. Webb, told him that there was no chance of beating the Russians to launching a space station, and he was not certain that NASA could orbit a man around the Moon first, so the best option would be to attempt to land a man on the Moon. This would also be the most expensive option; Webb believed it would require $22 billion (equivalent to $181 billion in 2025) to achieve it by 1970. Johnson also consulted with Wernher von Braun; military leaders, including Lieutenant General Bernard Schriever; and three business executives: Frank Stanton from CBS, Donald C. Cook from American Electric Power, and George R. Brown from Brown & Root.

Kennedy stood before Congress on May 25, 1961, and proposed that the US "should commit itself to achieving the goal, before this decade is out, of landing a man on the Moon and returning him safely to the Earth." The proposal did not initially have widespread support; a May 1961 Gallup Poll indicated that 58 percent of Americans were opposed to it.

Kennedy's goal provided a specific direction to NASA's Apollo program, which required expansion of NASA's Space Task Group into the Manned Spacecraft Center. Houston, Texas, was chosen as the site for the new center, and the Humble Oil and Refining Company donated the land in 1961 through Rice University as an intermediary. Kennedy took a two-day visit in September 1962 to the new facility. He was escorted by Mercury Seven astronauts Scott Carpenter and John Glenn, and shown models of the Gemini and Apollo spacecraft. Kennedy also viewed Friendship 7, the Mercury spacecraft in which Glenn had made America's first orbital flight. He took advantage of the opportunity to deliver a speech to drum up support for the nation's space effort. Initial drafts of the speech were written by Ted Sorensen, with changes by Kennedy.

== Speech delivery ==
Kennedy's speech on the nation's space effort delivered at Rice Stadium on September 12, 1962. The portion of the speech with the sentence "We choose to go to the Moon" begins at 9:00.

On September 12, 1962, a warm and sunny day, President Kennedy delivered his speech before a crowd of about 40,000 people, at Rice University's Rice Stadium. Many individuals in the crowd were Houston schoolchildren and Rice University freshmen. The middle portion of the speech has been widely quoted:

We set sail on this new sea because there is new knowledge to be gained, and new rights to be won, and they must be won and used for the progress of all people. For space science, like nuclear science and all technology, has no conscience of its own. Whether it will become a force for good or ill depends on man, and only if the United States occupies a position of pre-eminence can we help decide whether this new ocean will be a sea of peace or a new terrifying theater of war. I do not say that we should or will go unprotected against the hostile misuse of space any more than we go unprotected against the hostile use of land or sea, but I do say that space can be explored and mastered without feeding the fires of war, without repeating the mistakes that man has made in extending his writ around this globe of ours. There is no strife, no prejudice, no national conflict in outer space as yet. Its hazards are hostile to us all. Its conquest deserves the best of all mankind, and its opportunity for peaceful cooperation may never come again. But why, some say, the Moon? Why choose this as our goal? And they may well ask, why climb the highest mountain? Why, 35 years ago, fly the Atlantic? Why does Rice play Texas? We choose to go to the Moon. We choose to go to the Moon... We choose to go to the Moon in this decade and do the other things, not because they are easy, but because they are hard; because that goal will serve to organize and measure the best of our energies and skills, because that challenge is one that we are willing to accept, one we are unwilling to postpone, and one we intend to win, and the others, too.

The joke referring to the Rice–Texas football rivalry was handwritten by Kennedy into the speech text. Although the Rice–Texas rivalry was highly competitive at the time of Kennedy's speech, with Rice holding an 18-17-1 edge over Texas from 1930 to 1966, Rice has only beaten Texas in 1965 and 1994 since Kennedy's speech.

== Rhetoric ==
Kennedy's speech used three strategies: "a characterization of space as a beckoning frontier; an articulation of time that locates the endeavor within a historical moment of urgency and plausibility; and a final, cumulative strategy that invites audience members to live up to their pioneering heritage by going to the Moon."

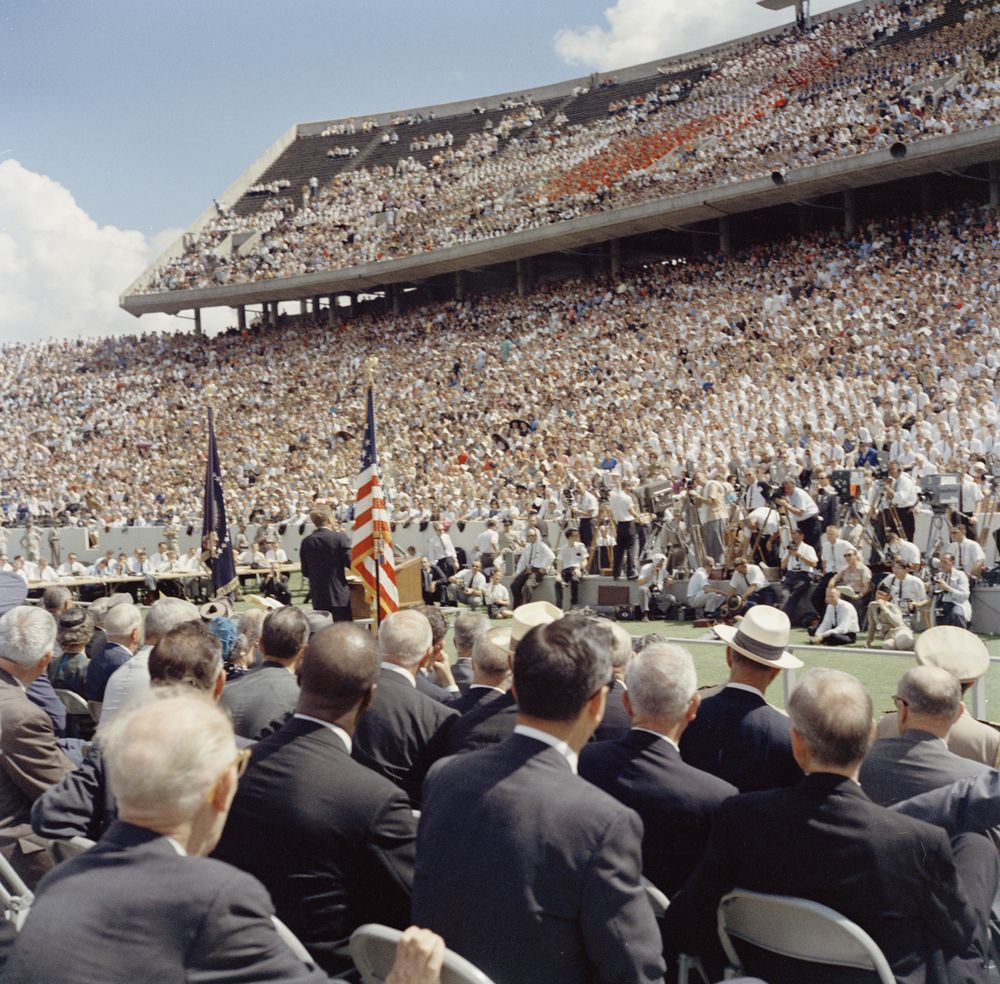
The crowd at Rice University watching Kennedy's speech

When addressing the crowd at Rice University, he equated the desire to explore space with the pioneering spirit that had dominated American folklore since the nation's foundation. This allowed Kennedy to reference back to his inaugural address, when he declared to the world "Together let us explore the stars". When he met with Nikita Khrushchev, General Secretary of the Communist Party of the Soviet Union and Premier of the Soviet Union, in June 1961, Kennedy proposed making the Moon landing a joint project, but Khrushchev did not take up the offer.

There was rhetorical opposition in the speech to extending the militarization of space. Kennedy verbally condensed human history to fifty years, in which "only last week did we develop penicillin and television and nuclear power, and now if America's new spacecraft succeeds in reaching Venus (Mariner 2), we will have literally reached the stars before midnight tonight." With this extended metaphor, Kennedy sought to imbue a sense of urgency and change in his audience. Most prominently, the phrase "We choose to go to the Moon" in the Rice speech was repeated three times consecutively, followed by an explanation that climaxes in his declaration that the challenge of space is "one that we are willing to accept, one we are unwilling to postpone, and one which we intend to win."

Considering the line before he rhetorically asked the audience why they choose to compete in tasks that challenge them, Kennedy highlighted here the nature of the decision to go to space as being a choice, an option that the American people have elected to pursue. Rather than claim it as essential, he emphasized the benefits such an endeavor could provide – uniting the nation and the competitive aspect of it. As Kennedy told Congress earlier, "whatever mankind must undertake, free men must fully share." These words emphasized the freedom enjoyed by Americans to choose their destiny rather than have it chosen for them. Combined with Kennedy's overall usage of rhetorical devices in the Rice University speech, they were particularly apt as a declaration that began the American space race.

Kennedy depicted a romantic notion of space exploration in the Rice University speech in which all citizens of the United States, and even the world, could participate, vastly increasing the number of citizens interested in space exploration. He began by talking about space as the new frontier for all of mankind, instilling the dream within the audience. He then condensed human history to show that within a very brief period of time space travel will be possible, informing the audience that their dream is achievable. He used the first-personal plural "we" to represent all the people of the world that would allegedly explore space together, but also involves the crowd.

== Reception ==
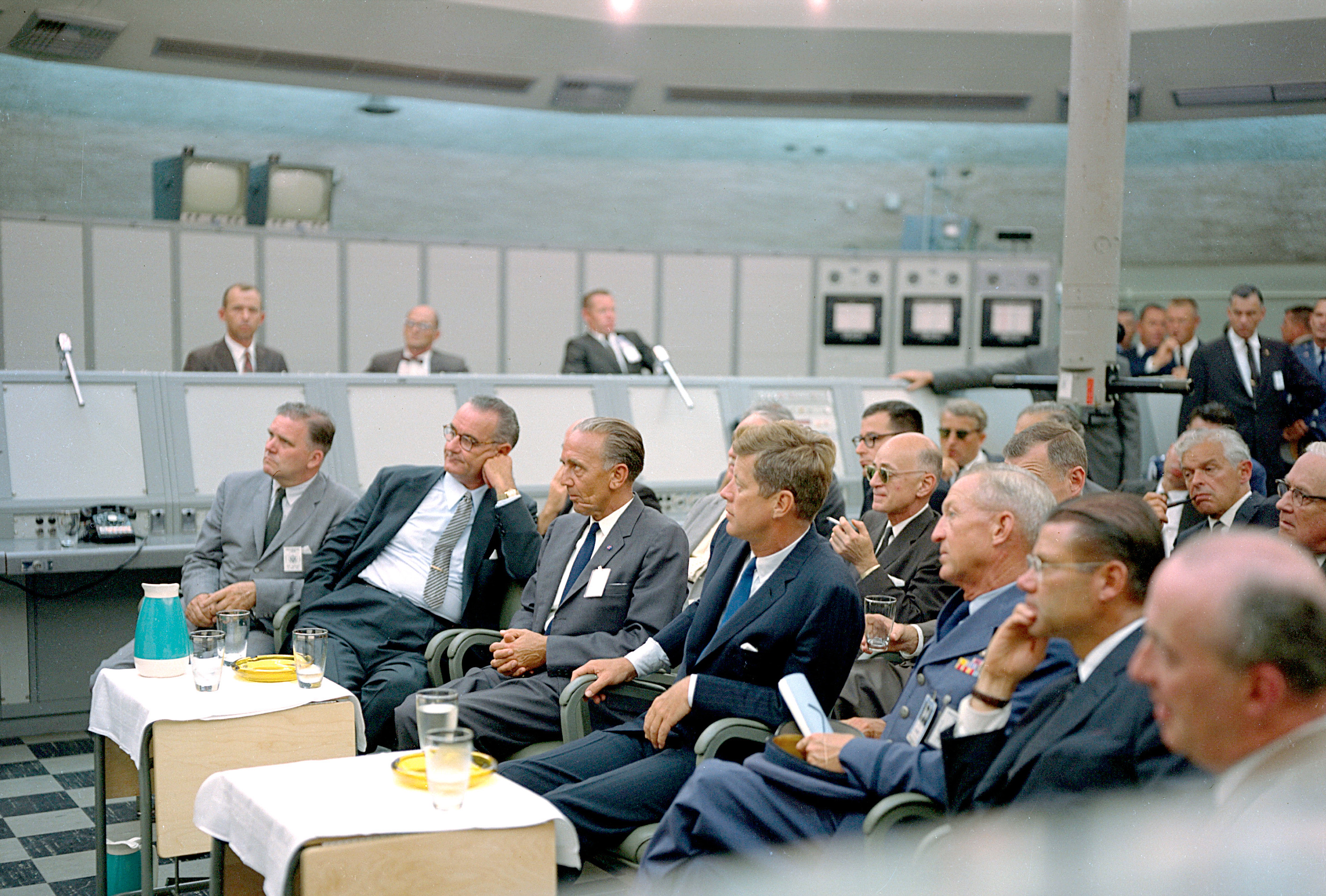
Kennedy attending a briefing at Cape Canaveral on September 11, 1962. With him in the front row are (from left) NASA administrator James Webb, Vice President Lyndon Johnson, NASA Launch Center director Kurt Debus, Lieutenant General Leighton I. Davis and Secretary of Defense Robert McNamara.

Paul Burka, the executive editor of Texas Monthly magazine, a Rice alumnus who was present in the crowd that day, recalled 50 years later that the speech "speaks to the way Americans viewed the future in those days. It is a great speech, one that encapsulates all of recorded history and seeks to set it in the history of our own time. Unlike today's politicians, Kennedy spoke to our best impulses as a nation, not our worst."

Ron Sass and Robert Curl were among the many members of the Rice University faculty present. Curl was amazed by the cost of the space exploration program. They recalled that the ambitious goal did not seem so remarkable at the time, and that Kennedy's speech was not regarded as so different from one delivered by President Dwight D. Eisenhower at Rice's Autry Court in 1960; but that speech has long since been forgotten, while Kennedy's is still remembered.

The speech did not stem a rising tide of disquiet about the Moon landing effort. There were many other things that the money could be spent on. Eisenhower declared, "To spend $40 billion to reach the Moon is just nuts." Senator Barry Goldwater argued that the civilian space program was pushing the more important military one aside. Senator William Proxmire feared that scientists would be diverted away from military research into space exploration. A budget cut was only narrowly averted.

Kennedy gave a speech to the United Nations General Assembly on September 20, 1963, in which he again proposed a joint expedition to the Moon. Khrushchev remained cautious about participating, and responded with a statement in October 1963 in which he declared that the Soviet Union had no plans to send cosmonauts to the Moon. However, his military advisors persuaded him that the offer was a good one, as it would enable the Soviet Union to acquire American technology. Kennedy ordered reviews of the Apollo project in April, August and October 1963. The final report was received on November 29, 1963, a week after Kennedy's assassination.

== Legacy ==
Although the idea of a joint Moon mission was abandoned after Kennedy's death, the Apollo Project became a memorial to him. His goal was fulfilled in July 1969, with the successful Apollo 11 Moon landing, the enduring legacy of Kennedy's speech. His deadline demanded a necessarily narrow focus, and there was little indication of what should be done next once it was achieved. While Apollo did not usher in an era of lunar exploration, it sent six more crewed missions to the Moon, ending with Apollo 17 in 1972. Subsequent planned Apollo missions were cancelled.

The Space Shuttle and International Space Station projects never captured the public imagination the way the Apollo Project did, and NASA struggled to realize its visions with inadequate resources. Ambitious visions of space exploration were proposed by Presidents George H. W. Bush in 1989 (Space Exploration Initiative) and George W. Bush in 2004 (Constellation program). After cancellation of Constellation, the future of the American space program seemed uncertain.

The lectern Kennedy spoke from as he gave his speech is on display at Space Center Houston.

== See also ==
- "One small step"
- George Mallory
