= Carrying the Fire =

1974 memoir by Apollo 11 astronaut Michael Collins

Carrying the Fire: An Astronaut's Journeys
- 40th Anniversary edition (2009)
- Author: Michael Collins
- Language: English
- Subject: Autobiography; Science
- Published: 1974 (Cooper Square Press); 2009 (Farrar, Straus & Giroux; 2019 (Farrar, Straus & Giroux; Pan)
- Pages: 478
- ISBN: 0-8154-1028-X
- OCLC: 897906
- Dewey Decimal: 629.45/0092 B 21
- LC Class: TL789.85.C65 A3 1998
- Followed by: Flying to the Moon and Other Strange Places

Carrying the Fire: An Astronaut's Journeys is the autobiography of the Gemini 10 and Apollo 11 astronaut Michael Collins. It was released in 1974 with a foreword by the aviator Charles Lindbergh (who died that year). The book was re-released in 2009 to coincide with the 40th anniversary of the first crewed lunar landing, and again for its 50th anniversary, in 2019.

The book covers Collins's life as a test pilot in the United States Air Force; his selection as an astronaut and his spacewalks on Gemini 10 and historic flight as the command module pilot on Apollo 11. Collins presents some candid insights into his astronaut colleagues, including Neil Armstrong ("I can't offhand think of a better choice to be the first man on the moon") and Buzz Aldrin ("would make a champion chess player; always thinks several moves ahead").

== Background ==
Collins was originally going to title the book World in my Window, but he later decided that was "too corny". After discussing it with his editor, they decided to use three words to describe spaceflight. Collins decided on Carrying the Fire.

In the book, Collins discusses the selection of the first person to walk on the Moon, and the resulting tension that arose from it.

== Reception ==
In his review for Time magazine, Robert Sherrod calls it "the best-written book yet by any of the astronauts". As an author, Collins worked without assistance from ghost writers, stating that "No matter how good the ghost, I am convinced that a book loses realism when an interpreter stands between the storyteller and his audience". Collins subsequently released further titles, including Flying to the Moon and Other Strange Places (1976), Liftoff: The Story of America's Adventure in Space (1988) and Mission to Mars (1990).

== See also ==
- First Man: The Life of Neil A. Armstrong, 2005 biography
- A Man on the Moon The Voyages of the Apollo Astronauts, a 1994 book
- One Giant Leap, a 2019 book
