= Dora Jane Hamblin =

American journalist (1920–1993)

- Dora Jane Hamblin, from 1961 newspaper
- Born: June 15, 1920; Bedford, Iowa, US
- Died: August 17, 1993 (aged 73); Trevignano Romano, Italy
- Other name: Dodie Hamblin
- Occupations: Journalist, editor

Dora Jane Hamblin (June 15, 1920 – August 17, 1993), known as Dodie Hamblin, was an American journalist and editor. She was the Rome bureau chief for Life magazine in Rome from 1956 to 1960, and oversaw the magazine's coverage of the 1960 Summer Olympics. She was granted special access to the families of astronauts in the Apollo program, to write the book, First on the Moon (1970).

== Early life and education ==
Dora Jane Hamblin was born in Bedford, Iowa, the daughter of Allen Woolcott Hamblin and Grace Juliette Sailor Hamblin. Her father was a World War I veteran and a newspaper editor and publisher. She graduated from Coe College in 1941, as a journalism major. She was president of her sorority, Delta Delta Delta, and president of the school's Panhellenic Council, while in college, and played tennis, hockey and basketball. She earned a master's degree from Northwestern University in 1942.

== Career ==
During World War II, Hamblin worked at the Cedar Rapids Gazette, and for the American Red Cross in Europe and New Guinea. After the war, she wrote for the Red Cross Courier. She joined the staff of Life magazine in 1948, first as a researcher, and soon as a correspondent in Europe. She covered Eisenhower's 1950 visit to Europe with Gordon Parks. She became the magazine's bureau chief in Rome in 1956; during her tenure there, she oversaw the magazine's coverage of the 1960 Summer Olympics and the election of Pope John XXIII. In 1960 she became assistant editor of the magazine, based in New York City, and in Houston from 1967 to 1969, to cover the Apollo program. She retired from Life in 1970. She also wrote for Sports Illustrated, Smithsonian, and other national periodicals.

Books by Hamblin included First on the Moon (1970, with Gene Farmer), Pots and Robbers (1970), Buried Cities and Ancient Treasures (1973), The First Cities (1973), The Appian Way (1974, with Mary Jane Grunsfeld), The Etruscans (1975), and her memoir, That Was The Life (1977). She also helped actress Mary Martin with her autobiography, My Heart Belongs (1976).

== Personal life and legacy ==
In 1970, Hamblin retired to Trevignano, Italy, and continued writing. She died from a heart attack in Italy, in 1993, aged 73 years. Her papers are in the Iowa Women's Archives at the University of Iowa, as well as the George T. Henry College Archives of Coe College. Some of her recordings and notes are also in the Time Inc. Life Editorial Records at the New-York Historical Society. Hamblin appears in The Astronaut Wives Club (2013) by Lily Koppel.
