= Café Pamplona =

Café in Cambridge, Massachusetts, US

Coordinates: 42.3717°N 71.1155°W

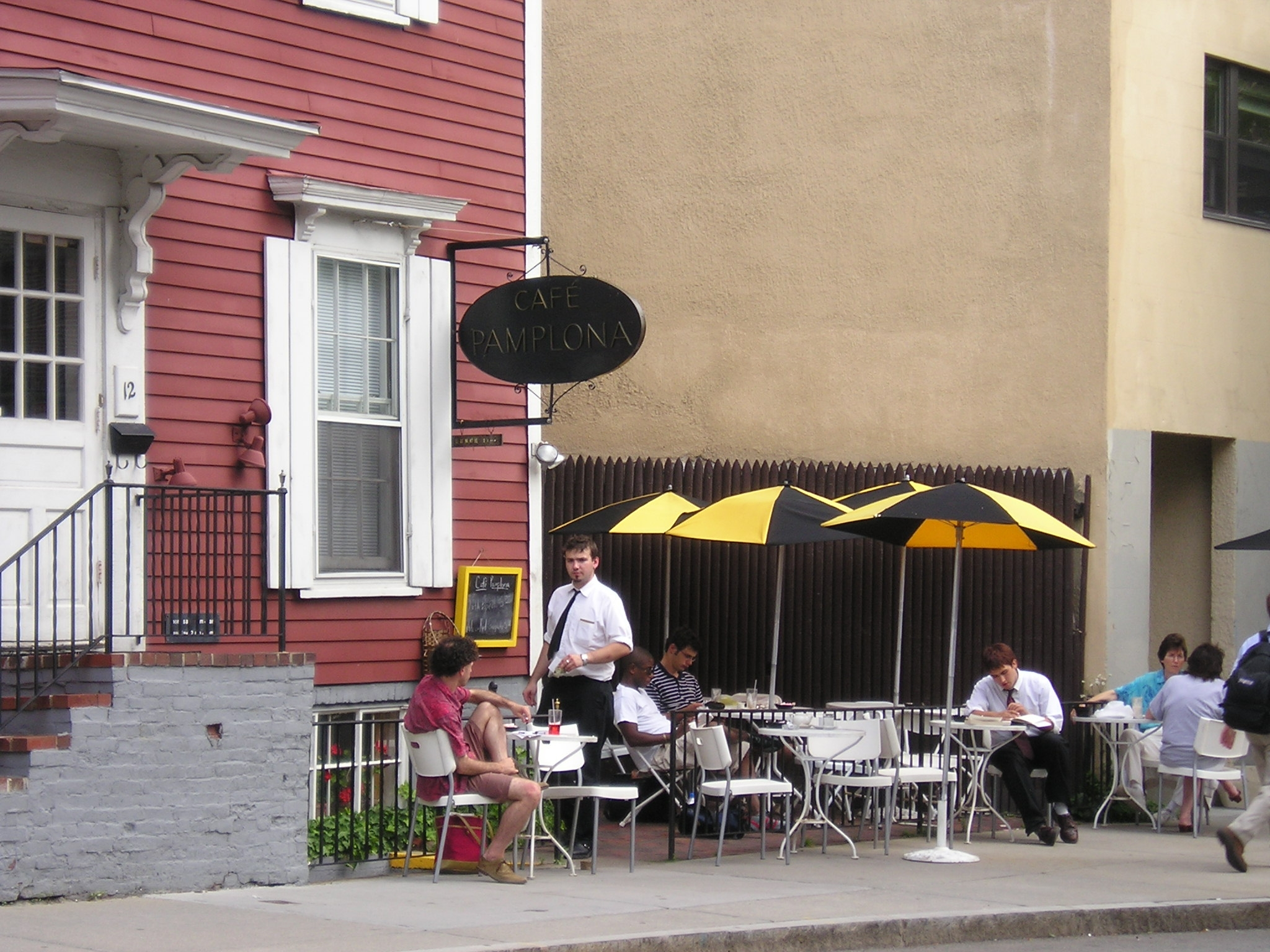
Café Pamplona, August 2005

Café Pamplona was a coffeehouse at 12 Bow St. beside the intersection of Bow and Arrow Streets near Harvard Square in Cambridge, Massachusetts, United States. When it opened in 1959 it was the first café in the Square. The owner, Josefina Yanguas, claimed the café had the first espresso-maker in the city. Down a short flight of exterior stairs, past a patio with tables, customers entered the café's subterranean interior. The once austere decor included bright yellow lights which made the thickly-plastered walls glow under low ceilings, and a black and white checked floor. The café survived the changes that had taken place since the mid-1980s.

== History ==
Josefina Yanguas, who arrived in America in 1947, roughly modelled the café after those of her native Pamplona, Spain. From 1959 until her death in 2007, Yanguas was the only owner of the café.

Shortly after the café opened Yanguas and her Cuban chef Juana Rodríguez began preparing and serving food. As business grew Yanguas began to hire only men, in accord with the usual Spanish practice of having a single-sex staff, until 1999. That fall, this policy was revealed by The Harvard Crimson. Manager James Timberlake hired Jenny Follen in late 1999, the first female employee in the cafe's 40 years; after that point, the café observed standard hiring practices.

The café attracted both bohemians and academics from both nearby Harvard University and the greater Cambridge community. Notable patrons of the café include Al Gore and Amanda Palmer.

The small mural on a wall in the cafe was painted fresco-style directly on site, by local artist Conger Metcalf, a friend of the owner. Completed some time in the late sixties, its yellowed background was due to years of exposure to cigarette smoke. During this period the walls in the café needed to be repainted every four years as they would significantly yellow from smoke. While the central figure looks strikingly like Yanguas, she said it was not her portrait.

In December 2004, after 46 years, Yanguas put the Pamplona up for sale, but did not generate significant interest. In May 2005, she reopened the café. She died on August 1, 2007, at the age of 90.

In 2006, the café got a new owner, Nina Hovigimian. In an article in the May 30, 2020 Harvard Crimson, Hovigimian said that as a result of the COVID lockdown, a decline in business had forced her into bankruptcy. Whether the café would recapitalize and reopen was not known at that time.

== Pamplona references ==
Throughout the years the café and Yanguas's house have been mentioned by a variety of media outlets. It has been named best café in the Boston area by Improper Bostonian and other local publications. In 2000 an architectural exposé was written about Yanguas's apartment in the Boston Globe Magazine.

The café has been mentioned on NPR and in a variety of artists' reflections. Because of its atmosphere and history, Pamplona served as the inspiration for a variety of artists and thinkers. Reminiscent anecdotes of reading, working and talking in the café are recounted by a number of Harvard and Cambridge luminaries.

- The café was the location for a scene in the film Prozac Nation.
- Accounts of the café regularly appear in memoirs, including Pepper White's The Idea Factory: Learning to Think at MIT.
- In April 2004, painter and sculptor (and former head waiter 1999–2005) Jeffrey P. Smith built an art installation for the Boston Museum School 5th Year program. Called "Space for Solitude", it was largely based on architectural details of the café. The door which had been on the café since its opening (1959–2004) was the same door used in Smith's installation. In his catalogue essay he dedicated the work in part to owner Yanguas.
- In January and February 2006, the café's courtyard was the site of a temporary public art installation by DeWitt Godfrey titled "Pamplona," sponsored by the Cambridge Arts Council.
- Café Pamplona is mentioned in The Dresden Dolls' song "Truce", composed by Amanda Palmer: "You can have Africa, Asia, Australia, as long as you keep your hands off Café Pamplona."
- The café is mentioned in the 2003 Jhumpa Lahiri novel The Namesake.
- The café appears in the background of the rooftop photo of Claudia Gonson in the booklet in The Magnetic Fields' CD box set of 69 Love Songs.
- Café Pamplona is mentioned in Part III ("The New World") of Eva Hoffman's memoir Lost In Translation: A Life in a New Language.

== Bibliography ==
- Cafe Pamplona & Cambridge Iruña Cookbook, by Josefina Yanguas, Lulu.com, February, 2005, ISBN 1-4116-2356-8 ISBN 978-1411623569
- Eliodora ‘Josefina’ Yanguas Perez opened Harvard Square’s first European-style café
