= From the Earth to the Moon (miniseries) =

1998 American TV miniseries about NASA's Apollo program

- Title caption
- Genre: Docudrama
- Based on: A Man on the Moon by Andrew Chaikin
- Theme music composer: Michael Kamen
- Composers: Michael Kamen; Mark Mancina; Mark Isham; Mason Daring; James Newton Howard; Brad Fiedel; Jeff Beal; Marc Shaiman
- Country of origin: United States
- Original language: English
- No. of episodes: 12

Production
- Executive producer: Tom Hanks
- Producers: Brian Grazer; Ron Howard; Michael Bostick
- Running time: 60 minutes
- Production companies: Imagine Television; Clavius Base Productions; HBO Original Programming
- Budget: $50 million

Original release
- Network: HBO
- Release: April 5 – May 10, 1998

From the Earth to the Moon is a 1998 American twelve-part television miniseries co-produced by Ron Howard, Brian Grazer, Tom Hanks and Michael Bostick. The series aired on HBO from April 5 to May 10, 1998. In docudrama format, it tells the story of the Apollo program during the 1960s and early 1970s. Largely based on Andrew Chaikin's 1994 book, A Man on the Moon, the series is known for its accurate telling of the story of Apollo and the special effects under visual director Ernest D. Farino. The series takes its title from, but is not based upon, Jules Verne's 1865 science fiction novel From the Earth to the Moon.

Hanks appears in every episode, introducing each of the first eleven. The twelfth and final episode, represented in pseudo-documentary format, is narrated by Blythe Danner, interspersed with a reenactment of the production of Georges Méliès' 1902 film Le Voyage dans la Lune, also in part inspired by Verne's novel. Hanks narrates and appears in these scenes as Méliès' assistant, with Tchéky Karyo as Méliès.

== Cast ==
The miniseries has a fairly large cast. It portrays 30 of the 32 astronauts who flew, or were preparing to fly, the 12 missions of the Apollo program. (The only two Apollo astronauts not portrayed by credited actors are Apollo 13 Command Module pilot Jack Swigert, who is heard but not seen in Episode 8, and Apollo 17 Command Module pilot Ronald Evans, who has a brief appearance in the liftoff scene of Apollo 17 in the final episode.) Members of many of the astronauts' families, and other NASA and non-NASA personnel, are also portrayed.

Several fictional (or fictionalized) characters are also included, notably television newscaster Emmett Seaborn (Lane Smith) who appears in nine of the 12 episodes.

Astronaut David Scott, from Apollo 15, was the chief technological consultant.

== Episodes ==
The 12 episodes, each directed by a different person, use a variety of viewpoints and themes, while sequentially covering the Mercury, Gemini, and Apollo programs. Lane Smith portrays Emmett Seaborn, a seasoned reporter for a fictional television network who covers the U.S. space program from its earliest days, providing continuity for most of the episodes.

No.	Title	Directed by	Written by	Original release date
1	"Can We Do This?"	Tom Hanks	Steven Katz	April 5, 1998
Covers the early years of the United States' "Space Race" with the Soviet Union, including the creation of NASA and the decision to send men to the Moon. Provides an overview of the Mercury and Gemini programs, concentrating on reconstructions of Alan Shepard's pioneering Freedom 7 Mercury flight; Ed White's first US spacewalk on Gemini 4, the near-disastrous in-flight failure during Neil Armstrong's and David Scott's Gemini 8 mission; and the successful completion of Gemini with Buzz Aldrin's perfection of extravehicular activity on Gemini 12.
2	"Apollo One"	David Frankel	Graham Yost	April 5, 1998
Portrays the tragedy of the Apollo 1 fire from the perspective of its subsequent investigation by NASA and the US Congress. Its effects on key individuals are shown, including Harrison Storms of North American Aviation, Joseph Shea of NASA, astronaut Frank Borman charged with supporting NASA's investigation, and the widows of Gus Grissom, Ed White and Roger Chaffee.
3	"We Have Cleared the Tower"	Lili Fini Zanuck	Remi Aubuchon	April 12, 1998
Portrays the Apollo program's recovery to crewed flight after the Apollo 1 tragedy, from the perspective of a fictional documentary team covering the flight of Apollo 7. This flight is commanded by strong-willed Mercury veteran Wally Schirra, who is focused on safety after the death of his colleague Grissom. Pad Leader Günter Wendt, another zealous guardian of astronaut safety, is featured by the documentary team.
4	"1968"	David Frankel	Al Reinert	April 12, 1998
Depicts Apollo 8's historic first crewed lunar flight, as the redemption of an otherwise strife-torn year filled with political assassinations, war, and unrest. Documentary footage of the turbulent political events are interspersed with the drama, which is mostly filmed in black and white except for scenes aboard the spacecraft and some color newsreel footage. The fears of mission commander Frank Borman's wife Susan of the possibility of her husband dying in a spacecraft trapped in lunar orbit are highlighted. Includes the Apollo 8 Genesis reading.
5	"Spider"	Graham Yost	Andy Wolk	April 19, 1998
Returns to 1961, and NASA engineer John Houbolt's lonely fight to convince management that the easiest way to land men on the Moon will be to use a separate landing craft employing lunar orbit rendezvous. It then traces the design and development of the Lunar Module by a team led by Grumman engineer Tom Kelly. Covers the selection and training of the first crew to fly it, James McDivitt and Rusty Schweickart (along with Command Module pilot David Scott), and culminates with their first flight of Spider in Earth orbit on Apollo 9 and Apollo 10's lunar "dress rehearsal".
6	"Mare Tranquilitatis"	Frank Marshall	Al Reinert; Graham Yost; Tom Hanks	April 19, 1998
A dramatization of the Apollo 11 first Moon landing at Tranquility Base in Mare Tranquillitatis ("Sea of Tranquility") is interspersed with flashback sequences of Emmett Seaborn's television interview with the crew of Neil Armstrong, Lunar Module pilot Buzz Aldrin, and Command Module pilot Michael Collins.
7	"That's All There Is"	Jon Turteltaub	Paul McCudden; Erik Bork; Tom Hanks	April 26, 1998
The story of the Apollo 12 second lunar landing mission is told by Lunar Module Pilot Alan Bean. Bean, the last member of NASA Astronaut Group 3 to fly in space, narrates his experience with the tightly-knit, all-Navy crew commanded by Gemini veteran Pete Conrad, and accepts with humor and grace his responsibility for the failure of the first color TV camera on the lunar surface, and for almost fracturing his own skull by failing to properly secure the Command Module's TV camera before splashdown.
8	"We Interrupt This Program"	David Frankel	Peter Osterlund; Amy Brooke Baker	April 26, 1998
This episode covers the perilous flight of Apollo 13 entirely from the ground point of view; the astronauts are only heard on radio. Veteran TV spaceflight reporter Emmett Seaborn (Lane Smith) is summoned to broadcast the breaking news of the in-flight failure, as young reporter Brett Hutchings (Jay Mohr) is pulled off of sports to help with the coverage. As the crisis unfolds, Seaborn finds himself at odds with Hutchings' style of sensationalizing its impact on the astronauts' families, and criticizing NASA. Seaborn starts to feel he is being marginalized when the network decides to leave Hutchings on location in Houston, while sending him back to headquarters to provide only background coverage. The last straw falls when, after the successful recovery of the astronauts, Hutchings horns in on his traditional post-flight interview with flight controller Gene Kranz. Seaborn leaves dejectedly, not to be seen again until the episode on Apollo 17. A running gag in the episode about a proposed flight to Neptune was a reference to the Voyager 2 mission, one of NASA’s greatest triumphs.
9	"For Miles and Miles"	Gary Fleder	Erik Bork	May 3, 1998
In 1964, while riding high on his fame as America's first man in space and his expected command of the first Gemini mission, Alan Shepard is suddenly struck with Ménière's disease, characterized by vertigo and nausea. Flight operations director Deke Slayton must ground him, but offers him the job of chief astronaut, effectively making Shepard Slayton's assistant as supervisor of all the astronauts. A few years later, a surgeon tries an experimental surgery which cures Shepard's symptoms, and he is returned to the flight rotation, commanding Apollo 14 in early 1971, which accomplishes Apollo 13's failed Fra Mauro landing. Shepard brings a six-iron golf club head on board, which he fastens to a soil-collecting tool handle and uses to hit a ball "for miles and miles".
10	"Galileo Was Right"	David Carson	Jeffrey Fiskin; Remi Aubuchon	May 3, 1998
Scientist astronaut Harrison "Jack" Schmitt, a geologist, persuades his mentor, professor Lee Silver, to train the Apollo astronauts in selecting appropriate rock samples to collect through field experience, rather than the boring classroom lectures NASA has been using. Silver takes the four Apollo 15 prime and backup landing crew members (David Scott, James Irwin, Richard F. Gordon Jr., and Schmitt) to the southwestern desert, while lunar geologist Farouk El-Baz trains the Command Module pilots (Alfred Worden and Vance D. Brand) in high-altitude recognition of geological features using airplane flights over Hawaii. Schmitt is disappointed to learn his own Apollo 18 flight will be cancelled, but he still believes the training of the other astronauts is vital. It pays off when Scott and Irwin find the "Genesis Rock", originally believed to come from the Moon's primordial crust. The title refers to Scott's reproduction of an experiment proving Galileo's hypothesis that gravity will cause bodies of differing masses to fall at the same rate in a vacuum, by dropping a hammer and a feather.
11	"The Original Wives Club"	Sally Field	Karen Janszen; Tom Hanks; Erik Bork	May 10, 1998
Shows the Apollo program from the point of view of the nine wives of NASA's second group of astronauts, from 1962 beyond the end of the program. The burdens placed on them include maintaining a home while presenting a positive image to the news media, shielding their husbands from any family concerns which could affect their position in the flight rotation or ability to return to Earth safely, and comforting each other in the face of tragedies which kill Elliot See and Ed White. The episode is anchored by the Apollo 16 mission, during which recently married Ken Mattingly loses his wedding ring in the Command Module, and Lunar Module pilot Charles Duke finds it while Mattingly is performing a walk in deep space.
12	"Le Voyage Dans La Lune"	Jonathan Mostow	Tom Hanks	May 10, 1998
The story of the final lunar mission, Apollo 17, is told as a pseudo-documentary set several decades after the fact. Simulated interviews of various characters such as Emmett Seaborn and flight director Christopher C. Kraft Jr., in old-age makeup, are included. The documentary is interspersed with the story of early French film maker Georges Méliès' creation of his vision of a trip to the Moon, the 1902 film Le Voyage dans la Lune. Scenes from the original film are merged with the recreation of its filming.

== Integration with existing films ==
The miniseries, concentrating on the Apollo space program, was produced with an intent not to repeat other dramatic portrayals of events of the space race.

Project Mercury, which was portrayed in the 1983 film The Right Stuff, was briefly summarized in the first episode. Miniseries producers Hanks, Howard and Grazer, who had previously produced the 1995 film Apollo 13, shot the episode "We Interrupt This Program" from the perspective of the media covering that flight, as the film had already covered the story from the point of view of the crew and the mission control team.

== Production ==
Many of the actors had opportunity to interact and form friendships with the real life astronauts they were portraying. Brett Cullen, who played Apollo 9 Command Module pilot and Apollo 15 commander David Scott, was invited to the Scott family home each time an episode he appeared in was first televised. Two short clips from the final scenes of Apollo 13 were used in "That's All There Is"; a splashdown sequence, and a view of the recovery ship USS Iwo Jima (portrayed by USS New Orleans).

The original series was shot in Super 35, intended to be viewed on standard television sets of the time in 1.33:1 aspect ratio. With the proliferation of widescreen flat-panel TV sets the series was remastered in the 1.78:1 aspect ratio and re-released in 2005 as a 5-disc DVD box set. As is the case with most material shot in this format, the widescreen framing causes the loss (in some shots) of the top and bottom parts of the frames from the original broadcast, but reveals additional information on the left and right. This is not always noticeable because of careful transfer process, but in some scenes important details are lost. For example, in the first episode, when the Gemini 8 / Agena assembly is tumbling around in space with a stuck thruster, the thruster is not visible in the new widescreen version, as it is cut off by the top of the frame. Some captions have also been compromised.

Parts of the miniseries were filmed at the Disney-MGM Studios (now Disney's Hollywood Studios) in Orlando, Florida. Scenes of the moonwalks were shot inside the blimp hangars on a former Marine base in Tustin, California. Approximately half the area inside was converted to the Moon's surface, with the remainder used to hold production trailers. To simulate lunar surface gravity, weather balloons filled with helium were attached to the backs of the actors playing the astronauts in the lunar extravehicular activity scenes, effectively reducing their weights to one-sixth.

The score of "Spider" prominently features an imitation of the main title theme from the 1963 World War II movie The Great Escape, and Tom Kelly jokes about having a crew digging a tunnel out of the Grumman plant. The episode also featured a real Apollo Lunar Module (LM-13), which had been built for the Apollo 18 mission but was never used due to budget cuts.

The show was first announced in 1995 after the success of the film Apollo 13, and it was a joint venture between Imagine Television, Clavius Base Productions (later evolved into Playtone) and HBO, and cost $50 million to produce, making it the most expensive television miniseries.

== Awards and nominations ==
Year	Award	Category	Nominee(s)	Result	Ref.
1998	Artios Awards	Best Casting for Mini-Series	Meg Liberman, Marc Hirschfeld, and Deborah Brown	Nominated	
1998	Online Film & Television Association Awards	Best Miniseries		Nominated	
1998	Online Film & Television Association Awards	Best Direction of a Motion Picture or Miniseries		Nominated	
1998	Online Film & Television Association Awards	Best Writing of a Motion Picture or Miniseries		Won	
1998	Online Film & Television Association Awards	Best Ensemble in a Motion Picture or Miniseries		Nominated	
1998	Online Film & Television Association Awards	Best Costume Design in a Motion Picture or Miniseries		Nominated	
1998	Online Film & Television Association Awards	Best Editing in a Motion Picture or Miniseries		Won	
1998	Online Film & Television Association Awards	Best Lighting in a Motion Picture or Miniseries		Won	
1998	Online Film & Television Association Awards	Best Music in a Motion Picture or Miniseries		Nominated	
1998	Online Film & Television Association Awards	Best New Titles Sequence in a Motion Picture or Miniseries		Nominated	
1998	Online Film & Television Association Awards	Best New Theme Song in a Motion Picture or Miniseries		Nominated	
1998	Online Film & Television Association Awards	Best Production Design in a Motion Picture or Miniseries		Nominated	
1998	Online Film & Television Association Awards	Best Sound in a Motion Picture or Miniseries		Nominated	
1998	Online Film & Television Association Awards	Best Visual Effects in a Motion Picture or Miniseries		Nominated	
1998	Primetime Emmy Awards	Outstanding Miniseries	Tom Hanks, Tony To, John Melfi, Graham Yost, Michael Bostick, Brian Grazer, Ron Howard, Erik Bork, Bruce Richmond, and Janace Tashjian	Won	
1998	Primetime Emmy Awards	Outstanding Directing for a Miniseries or a Movie	Tom Hanks (for "Can We Do This?")	Nominated	
1998	Primetime Emmy Awards	Outstanding Writing for a Miniseries or a Movie	Graham Yost (for "Apollo One")	Nominated	
1998	Primetime Emmy Awards	Outstanding Art Direction for a Miniseries or a Movie	Richard Toyon, Kitty Doris-Bates, Seth Reed, Amy Wells, and Michele Poulik (for "Le Voyage Dans La Lune")	Nominated	
1998	Primetime Emmy Awards	Outstanding Casting for a Miniseries or a Movie	Craig Fincannon, Mark Fincannon, Marc Hirschfeld, Sharon Klein, Meg Liberman, Lisa Mae Wells Fincannon, and Deborah Brown	Won	
1998	Primetime Emmy Awards	Outstanding Cinematography for a Miniseries or a Movie	Gale Tattersall (for "Can We Do This?")	Nominated	
1998	Primetime Emmy Awards	Outstanding Costumes for a Miniseries or a Movie	Chrisi Karvonides-Dushenko (for "Le Voyage Dans La Lune")	Nominated	
1998	Primetime Emmy Awards	Outstanding Hairstyling for a Miniseries, Movie or a Special	Vicky Phillips and Lynda Gurasich	Won	
1998	Primetime Emmy Awards	Outstanding Makeup for a Miniseries, Movie or a Special	Gina Lamendola, Greg Cannom, and Ve Neill	Nominated	
1998	Primetime Emmy Awards	Outstanding Music Composition for a Miniseries or a Movie (Dramatic Underscore)	Michael Kamen (for "1968")	Nominated	
1998	Primetime Emmy Awards	Outstanding Single-Camera Picture Editing for a Miniseries or a Movie	Laurie Grotstein (for "Can We Do This?")	Nominated	
1998	Primetime Emmy Awards	Outstanding Single-Camera Picture Editing for a Miniseries or a Movie	Richard Pearson (for "1968")	Nominated	
1998	Primetime Emmy Awards	Outstanding Sound Editing for a Miniseries, Movie or a Special	Richard Taylor, Barbara Issak, Brian Thomas Nist, Joe Earle, Christopher Brooks, Jerry Edemann, David Melhase, James A. Williams, Benjamin Beardwood, Dennis Gray, Alyson Dee Moore, and Patricia Nedd (for "Can We Do This?")	Nominated	
1998	Primetime Emmy Awards	Outstanding Sound Mixing for a Drama Miniseries or a Movie	Joe Foglia, Scott Millan, and Brad Sherman (for "1968")	Nominated	
1998	Primetime Emmy Awards	Outstanding Sound Mixing for a Drama Miniseries or a Movie	Joe Foglia, Rick Ash, and Adam Sawelson (for "That's All There Is")	Nominated	
1998	Primetime Emmy Awards	Outstanding Sound Mixing for a Drama Miniseries or a Movie	Joe Foglia, Kevin Patrick Burns, and Todd Orr (for "La Voyage Dans La Lune")	Nominated	
1998	Primetime Emmy Awards	Outstanding Special Visual Effects for a Miniseries, Movie or a Special	David Altenau, Tony Cutrono, Burt Dalton, Ernest Farino, Matthew Gratzner, John Hoffman, Evan Jacobs, Adam Lovell, Eroc Moralls, James Roberts, and Ariel Velasco-Shaw (for "1968")	Nominated	
1998	Television Critics Association Awards	Program of the Year		Won	
1998	Television Critics Association Awards	Outstanding Achievement in Movies, Miniseries and Specials		Won	
1999	American Cinema Editors Awards	Best Edited Two-Hour Movie for Non-Commercial Television	Richard Pearson (for "1968")	Nominated	
1999	Art Directors Guild Awards	Excellence in Production Design Award – Television Movie or Mini-Series	Richard Toyon, Kitty Doris-Bates, and Seth Reed	Won	
1999	Cinema Audio Society Awards	Outstanding Achievement in Sound Mixing for Television – Movie of the Week, Mini-Series or Specials	Joe Foglia, Kevin Patrick Burns, and Todd Orr (for "Le Voyage Dans La Lune")	Won	
1999	Costume Designers Guild Awards	Excellence in Costume Design for Television	Chrisi Karvonides-Dushenko	Nominated	
1999	Critics' Choice Awards	Best Picture Made for Television		Won	
1999	Directors Guild of America Awards	Outstanding Directorial Achievement in Movies for Television or Miniseries	Jon Turteltaub (for "That's All There Is")	Nominated	
1999	Golden Globe Awards	Best Miniseries or Motion Picture Made for Television		Won	
1999	Producers Guild of America Awards	Best Long-Form Television	Tom Hanks, Tony To, John P. Melfi, Graham Yost, Brian Grazer, Ron Howard, Michael Bostick, Erik Bork, Bruce Richmond, and Janace Tashjian	Won	
1999	Producers Guild of America Awards	Visionary Award	Tom Hanks	Won	
1999	Satellite Awards	Best Miniseries or Motion Picture Made for Television		Won	
1999	Satellite Awards	Best Actor in a Miniseries or a Motion Picture Made for Television	Kevin Pollak	Nominated	
1999	Satellite Awards	Best Actor in a Supporting Role in a Miniseries or a Motion Picture Made for Television	David Clennon	Won	
1999	Satellite Awards	Best Actress in a Supporting Role in a Miniseries or a Motion Picture Made for Television	Rita Wilson	Won	
1999	Writers Guild of America Awards	Television: Episodic Drama	Graham Yost (for "Apollo One")	Nominated	
1999	Young Artist Awards	Best Educational TV Show or Series		Won	
2005	Satellite Awards	Outstanding Overall DVD		Won	

== See also ==
- Apollo 11 in popular culture
