= Conger Metcalf =

American painter

Conger Metcalf (1914–1998) was an American painter.

He was born in Cedar Rapids, Iowa and died in Boston, Massachusetts. Metcalf began his art studies in 1932 at the Iowa Stone City Art Colony, headed by American Regionalist painter Grant Wood. Metcalf continued his studies at Coe College in Cedar Rapids with Stone City co-founder Marvin Cone. Metcalf graduated from Coe in 1936, then attended the School of the Museum of Fine Arts, Boston. He received an honorary doctorate degree from Coe in 1964. During his late twenties, and during his military service in World War II, Metcalf studied European master painters in Italy and France. This formal European influence affected his style, which differs from the earthy realism of his American Regionalist mentors. Metcalf was well-known and very active in the Boston, Massachusetts art community. Today, his works can be seen at the Café Pamplona in Cambridge, Massachusetts, Addison Gallery of American Art in Andover, Massachusetts, and at the Conger Metcalf Gallery at Coe College. Various interviews and videos of Metcalf are also available at the George T. Henry College Archives at Coe College.
