= Coe College =

Private college in Cedar Rapids, Iowa, US

Coordinates: 41°59′18″N 91°39′25″W

- Former names: School for the Prophets (1851–1853); Cedar Rapids Collegiate Institute (1853–1875); Coe College Institute (1875–1881)
- Motto: Veritas Virtusque
- Motto in English: Truth and Virtue
- Type: Private
- Established: 1851; 175 years ago
- Accreditation: Higher Learning Commission; Commission on Collegiate Nursing Education
- Religious affiliation: Presbyterian Church (USA)
- Endowment: $103 million (as of 2022)
- President: David Hayes
- Faculty: 111 full-time and 32 part-time (Autumn 2023)
- Undergraduates: 1,278
- Location: 1220 First Avenue NE, Cedar Rapids, Iowa, 52402-5092, United States
- Campus: 70 acres (280,000 m^{2}); urban
- Colors: Crimson and gold
- Nickname: Kohawks
- Sporting affiliations: National Collegiate Athletic Association, Division III, American Rivers Conference
- Mascot: Charlie Kohawk
- Website: coe.edu

Coe College is a private liberal arts college in Cedar Rapids, Iowa, United States. It was founded in 1851 and is affiliated with the Presbyterian Church (USA). The college is a member of the Associated Colleges of the Midwest and the Association of Presbyterian Colleges and Universities.

== History ==
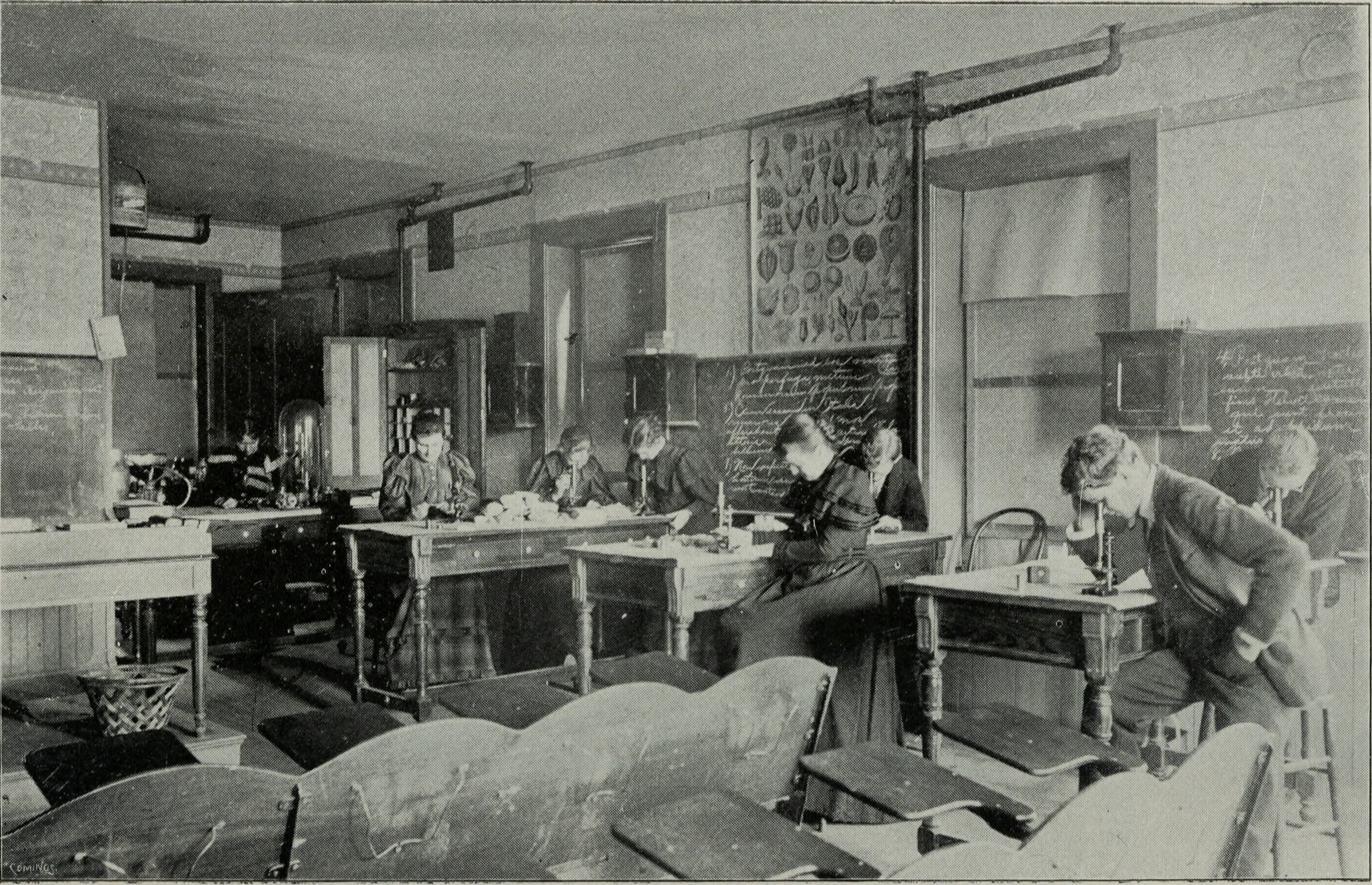
Coe College classroom and students in 1894.

Coe College was founded in 1851 by the Rev. Williston Jones as the School for the Prophets. While canvassing churches in the eastern United States to raise money for students to attend eastern seminaries, Jones met a farmer named Daniel Coe, who donated $1,500 and encouraged Jones to open a college in Cedar Rapids. Coe's gift came with the stipulation that the college should offer education to both men and women, and when the Cedar Rapids campus opened in 1853 as the Cedar Rapids Collegiate Institute, it was a co-educational institution. In 1875, the college was reestablished as Coe College Institute and in 1881, after a private donation from T. M. Sinclair, founder of the Sinclair Meat Packing Company, was finally founded as Coe College.

Coe was accredited by the North Central Association of Colleges and Schools in 1907. In 1910, Presbyterian clergyman John Abner Marquis became president and initiated a period of growth that lasted for several years; Marquis was a sought-after speaker and served as Moderator of the Presbyterian Church, its highest office.

== Academics ==
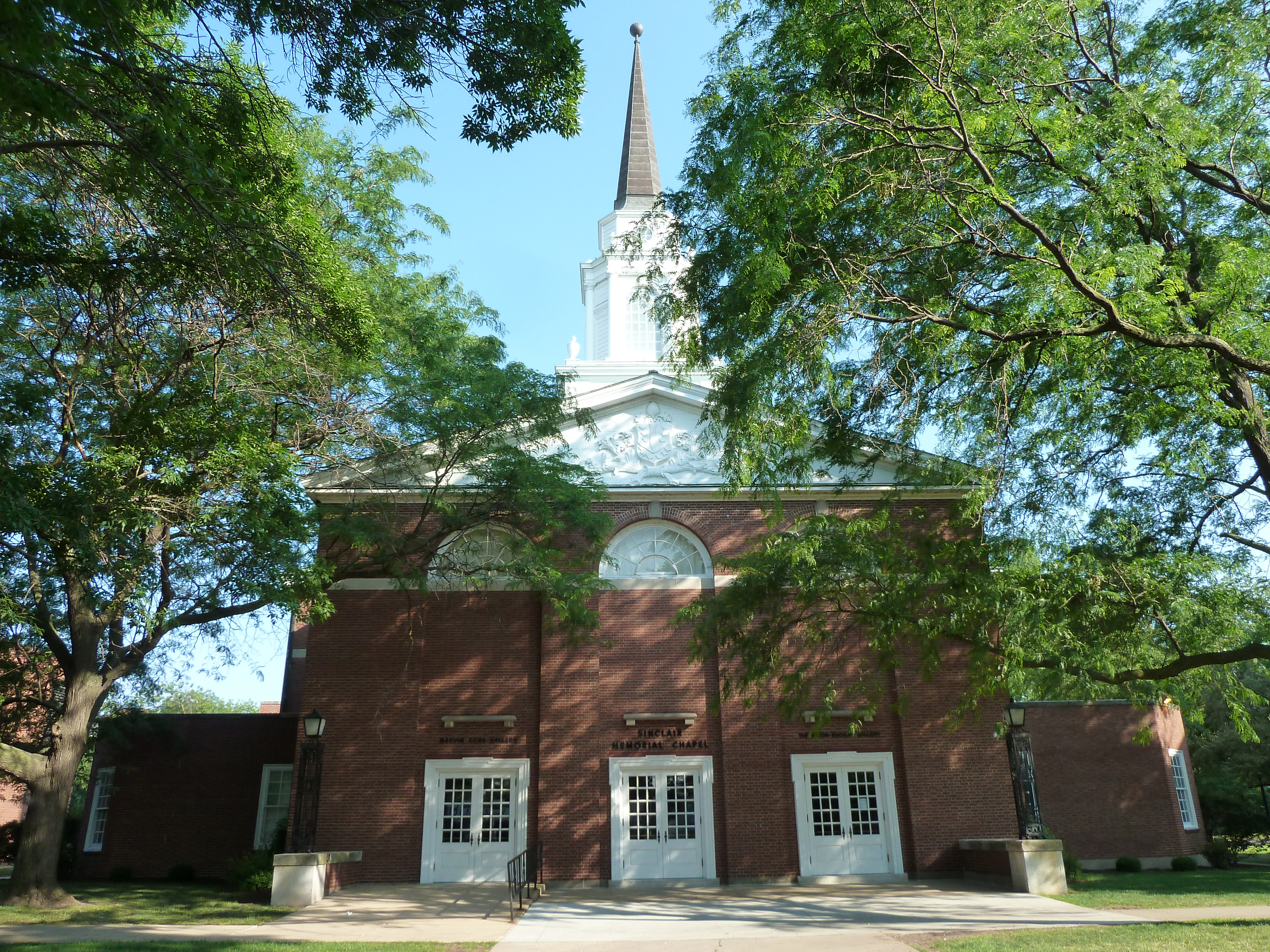
Sinclair Auditorium

Coe College awards the following degrees: Bachelor of Arts (B.A.), Bachelor of Music (B.M.), and Bachelor of Science in Nursing (B.S.N.). Coe offers more than 60 areas of study and provides the option for students to create their own major under the guidance of faculty members. Its three most popular majors, based on 2021 graduates, were Business Administration and Management (36 graduates), Psychology (35 graduates), and Biology/Biological Sciences (27 graduates).

In the autumn of 2023, 111 full-time faculty and 32 part-time faculty were employed by the college. The student-faculty ratio was 11:1.

== Stewart Memorial Library ==
Stewart Memorial Library contains more than 202,000 books and other materials. The library also features gallery spaces exhibiting work by Iowa artists Marvin Cone, Conger Metcalf, and Grant Wood.

== Student life ==
In 1972, a study found that Coe students had traditional values which were often in harmony with those of their parents.

Coe has an active Greek social community with four fraternities and five sororities.

== Writing center ==
Coe's Writing Center (CWC) is the largest undergraduate student-run writing center in the nation, with over 60 undergraduates on staff. It opened in 1986. The CWC now conducts over 2,000 student conferences a year. The CWC produces and distributes several small campus publications.

== Notable alumni ==
- Fran Allison – actress
- Michael Boddicker – musician
- Janet M. Box-Steffensmeier – political scientist
- Wilmer D. Elfrink – football and basketball coach
- Paul Engle – director of the Iowa Writers' Workshop
- Bill Fitch – basketball coach
- Edgar S. Furniss – economist and educator
- Chris Funk – musician
- J. Malcolm Garcia – author and journalist
- James William Good – US Congressman and Secretary of War
- Dora Jane Hamblin – journalist, editor
- Fred Hickman – sportscaster
- Timothy S. Hillman – U.S. District Court judge
- Fred Jackson – football player
- Jason Kottke – blogger, designer
- Marv Levy – football coach
- David McCosh – painter and professor
- Byron McKeeby – artist and professor
- Curt Menefee – sportscaster
- Conger Metcalf – painter
- Ronald Moon – Chief Justice of Hawaii Supreme Court (1993–2010)
- Dow Mossman – novelist
- Edward A. Ross – sociologist
- Bradley Marc Sherrill – nuclear physicist
- William Shirer – author
- Judith Sims – TeenSet Magazine Editor, Writer, Disc (UK) Contributor, Rolling Stone L.A. Bureau Chief.
- Gary Allan Sojka – university administrator
- Lindsay Souvannarath – attempted mass murderer
- Quentin Stanerson – politician, member of the Iowa House of Representatives
- Shelby Steele – author, sociologist, political commentator
- S. Donald Stookey – inventor
- Gregory Alan Williams – actor and author

== Athletics ==
Coe Kohawks wordmark

Coe College has 21 men's and women's athletic teams and is a member of Division III of the National Collegiate Athletic Association. Men's sports include baseball, basketball, cross country, football, golf, soccer, swimming & diving, tennis, track & field, and wrestling; women's sports include basketball, cross country, golf, soccer, softball, swimming & diving, tennis, track & field, and volleyball.

Coe also supports five co-educational athletic teams. They include Archery, Cheer, Dance, Clay Target and Esports. Their athletic team name is the Kohawks, a stylized bird; the college mascot is known as Charlie Kohawk.
