= A Man on the Moon =

1994 English-language book by Andrew Chaikin

- Author: Andrew Chaikin
- Language: English
- Subject: Apollo program
- Genre: Non-fiction
- Publisher: Viking
- Publication date: 1994
- ISBN: 0-670-81446-6
- OCLC: 29548704

A Man on the Moon: The Voyages of the Apollo Astronauts is a 1994 book by Andrew Chaikin. It describes the 1968–1972 voyages of the Apollo program astronauts in detail, from Apollo 7 to 17.

"A decade in the making, this book is based on hundreds of hours of in-depth interviews with each of the twenty-four moon voyagers, as well as those who contributed their brain power, training and teamwork on Earth."

This book formed the basis of the 1998 television miniseries From the Earth to the Moon. It was released in paperback in 2007 by Penguin Books, ISBN 978-0-14-311235-8.

== See also ==
- First Man: The Life of Neil A. Armstrong
- Carrying the Fire the autobiography of the Gemini 10 and Apollo 11 astronaut Michael Collins
- One Giant Leap, a 2019 book
- Moon Shot: The Inside Story of America's Race to the Moon
