= Thomas O'Toole =

American journalist

Thomas O'Toole (1931-November 12, 2003) was a science reporter and editor at The Washington Post from 1966 to 1987. His main subject was the space program, in particular the Apollo program to land men on the Moon. He extensively covered Skylab, the Apollo-Soyuz Test Project, the Voyager program to Jupiter, Saturn and Uranus, and the Space Shuttle program. O'Toole wrote many articles on energy, including the burgeoning nuclear power industry in America. He also covered significant espionage stories, from Cold War subjects to Watergate and the hunt for Nazi figures hiding in America and elsewhere after World War 2.

== Early life ==
O'Toole was born in 1931 in Jersey City and he attended high school and college at St. Peter's Prep (Jersey City) and St. Peter's College (now St. Peter's University, Jersey City). After military service in France, he earned a graduate journalism degree from Boston University and then worked at The Cape Cod Standard Times (now The Cape Cod Times) in Hyannis, reporting on the Andrea Doria ocean liner sinking of 1956. O'Toole returned to New York City, finding work with The Wall Street Journal (1957–1961), TIME magazine, and The New York Times (1965–66). He was a partner in the 1962 aerospace and culture magazine USA1, which published five issues before folding. He married Vitaline O'Connell in 1958 and they had four children.

== Career at The Washington Post ==
In the summer of 1966, Howard Simons and Ben Bradlee of The Washington Post hired O'Toole, as The Post was growing into a paper of national prominence. He immediately began covering the Lunar Orbiter program from the Jet Propulsion Laboratory in Pasadena. From there, his work covered aspects of the space program. His articles were frequently featured on the front page of the paper. O'Toole was twice nominated for the Pulitzer Prize and he was awarded the National Space Club Press Award in 1970.

Around 1980, O'Toole was invited to work with Marvin Cetron on Cetron's first book about the future, Encounters with the Future. Cetron and O'Toole were both contributors to Omni, which collected some of the best science news and writing of the time. Cetron's sweeping predictions, largely gained from his insider position at the Navy Advanced Research Laboratory, were put into context and prose by O'Toole, who brought his own working knowledge of science to the project. The book was published by McGraw-Hill in 1982.

O'Toole continued to cover space and energy, among other subjects, for The Washington Post. He visited Three Mile Island during the 1979 crisis at the Pennsylvania nuclear facility. He detailed the Space Shuttle program from its infancy, although he was in Pasadena covering deep space probe Voyager's encounter with Uranus when the Space Shuttle Challenger blew up in January 1986. The Washington Post published a book later that year called Challengers: The Inspiring Life Stories of the Seven Brave Astronauts of Shuttle Mission 51-L, with 12 Post reporters contributing. O'Toole wrote Chapter One.

On December 30, 1983, he wrote the article "Possibly as Large as Jupiter" in the Washington Post, which documented the idea that another planet or object in the Solar System is yet to be discovered and that the Earth is in a complex and still mysterious Solar System.

== Later life and career ==
After leaving The Washington Post in 1987, O'Toole worked for several years at public relations firm Powell-Tate in Washington. He was also an early editor and contributor to space.com. His second wife was Mary Kate Cranston and they had one child together. O'Toole died on November 12, 2003 from complications from diabetes.
