= First on the Moon (Armstrong, Collins, and Aldrin book) =

1970 book by the crew of the Apollo 11

- Author: Neil Armstrong, Michael Collins and Buzz Aldrin with Gene Farmer and Dora Jane Hamblin. Epilogue by Arthur C. Clarke
- Language: English
- Subject: Human spaceflight, Apollo 11 Moon landing
- Genre: Non-fiction
- Publisher: Little, Brown and Company
- Publication date: 1970
- Pages: 434
- ISBN: 0-316-05160-8

First on the Moon: A Voyage with Neil Armstrong, Michael Collins and Edwin E. Aldrin, Jr. (ISBN 0316051608) is a 1970 book by the crew of the Apollo 11 Moon landing (Neil Armstrong, Michael Collins, Buzz Aldrin) in collaboration with Gene Farmer and Dora Jane Hamblin. Epilogue by Arthur C. Clarke in the first edition. It describes the events leading up to and during the Apollo 11 mission, the first crewed landing on the Moon. It was first published in June 1970 by Little, Brown and Company.
