= Andrew Chaikin =

American journalist (born 1956)

- Born: Andrew L. Chaikin; June 24, 1956 (age 70)
- Citizenship: US
- Education: Brown University
- Occupations: Author, journalist
- Website: www.andrewchaikin.com

Andrew L. Chaikin (born June 24, 1956) is an American author, speaker and science journalist. He lives in Vermont.

He is the author of A Man on the Moon, a detailed description of the Apollo missions to the Moon. This book formed the basis for From the Earth to the Moon, a 12-part HBO miniseries.

From 1999 to 2001, Chaikin served as executive editor for space and science at Space.com. From 2008 to 2011, he was a faculty member for Montana State University in Bozeman, Montana. In 2013, he wrote and performed the narration on a NASA video re-creating the taking of the famous Earthrise photo during the Apollo 8 mission.

His book A Man on the Moon: One Giant Leap states that he grew up in Great Neck, New York, and, while studying geology at Brown University, worked at the NASA/Caltech Jet Propulsion Laboratory on the Viking program.

== Bibliography ==
- Chaikin, Andrew L.; Maxwell, Ted A.; El-Baz, Farouk (January 1981). "Temporal changes in the Cerberus region of Mars: Mariner 9 and Viking comparisons". Icarus. 45 (1): 167–178. Bibcode:1981Icar...45..167C. doi:10.1016/0019-1035(81)90012-9. ISSN 0019-1035. OCLC 4634534615.
- Beatty, J. Kelly; O'Leary, Brian; Chaikin, Andrew, eds. (1981). The New Solar System. Introduction by Carl Sagan. Cambridge; New York: Cambridge University Press. ISBN 978-0-521-23881-6. LCCN 81002661. OCLC 7461972.
- Chaikin, Andrew (1992). When Dinosaurs Walked. Curious Creatures. Illustrated by Patricia Wynne. Chicago: World Book. ISBN 978-0-716-61620-7. LCCN 91065749. OCLC 27022944.
- —— (1994). A Man on the Moon: The Voyages of the Apollo Astronauts. New York: Viking. ISBN 978-0-670-81446-6. LCCN 93048680. OCLC 29548704.
- —— (1997). Air and Space: The National Air and Space Museum Story of Flight. Foreword by Donald D. Engen (1st ed.). Boston, MA: National Air and Space Museum in association with Bulfinch Press/Little, Brown and Co. ISBN 978-0-821-22082-5. LCCN 96031929. OCLC 35174864.
- ——; Bean, Alan (1998). Apollo: An Eyewitness Account. Introduction by John Glenn. Shelton, CT: Greenwich Workshop Press. ISBN 978-0-867-13050-8. LCCN 98019512. OCLC 39292766.
- —— (1999) [Originally published 1994; New York: Viking]. A Man on the Moon: One Giant Leap. Vol. 1. Editors of Time–Life Books. Alexandria, VA: Time–Life Books. ISBN 978-0-783-55675-8. LCCN 99015449. OCLC 48565812.
- Light, Michael (1999). Full Moon. Essay by Andrew Chaikin (1st American ed.). New York: Alfred A. Knopf. ISBN 978-0-375-40634-8. LCCN 98083094. OCLC 41378164.
- Chaikin, Andrew (2001). Josh Simpson: Glass Artist. Madison, WI: Guild Publishing. ISBN 978-1-893-16409-3. LCCN 2002265965. OCLC 46851421.
- —— (2004) [Originally published 2002; London: Carlton]. Space: A History of Space Exploration in Photographs. Foreword by James A. Lovell (Reprint ed.). Richmond Hill, Ontario: Firefly Books. ISBN 978-1-552-97987-7. LCCN 2005357212. OCLC 54905689.
- —— (2007) [First published 1994; New York: Viking]. A Man on the Moon: The Voyages of the Apollo Astronauts. Foreword by Tom Hanks and a new afterword by the author (Reissue ed.). New York: Penguin Books. ISBN 978-0-14-311235-8. LCCN 2008270902. OCLC 166227448.
- —— (2008). A Passion for Mars: Intrepid Explorers of the Red Planet. Foreword by James Cameron. New York: Abrams. ISBN 978-0-810-97274-2. LCCN 2007049007. OCLC 182779576.
- ——; Kohl, Victoria (2009). Mission Control, This is Apollo: The Story of the First Voyages to the Moon. Paintings by Alan Bean. New York: Viking. ISBN 978-0-670-01156-8. LCCN 2009000833. OCLC 262428553.
- ——; Kohl, Victoria (2009). Voices from the Moon: Apollo Astronauts Describe Their Lunar Experiences. New York: Viking Studio. ISBN 978-0-670-02078-2. LCCN 2009280812. OCLC 318672096.

== Cameo appearance ==
In the HBO miniseries From the Earth to the Moon, Chaikin made a brief appearance in pseudo-documentary footage in the first episode as the host of Meet the Press.
