= James R. Hansen =

American historian (born June 12, 1952)

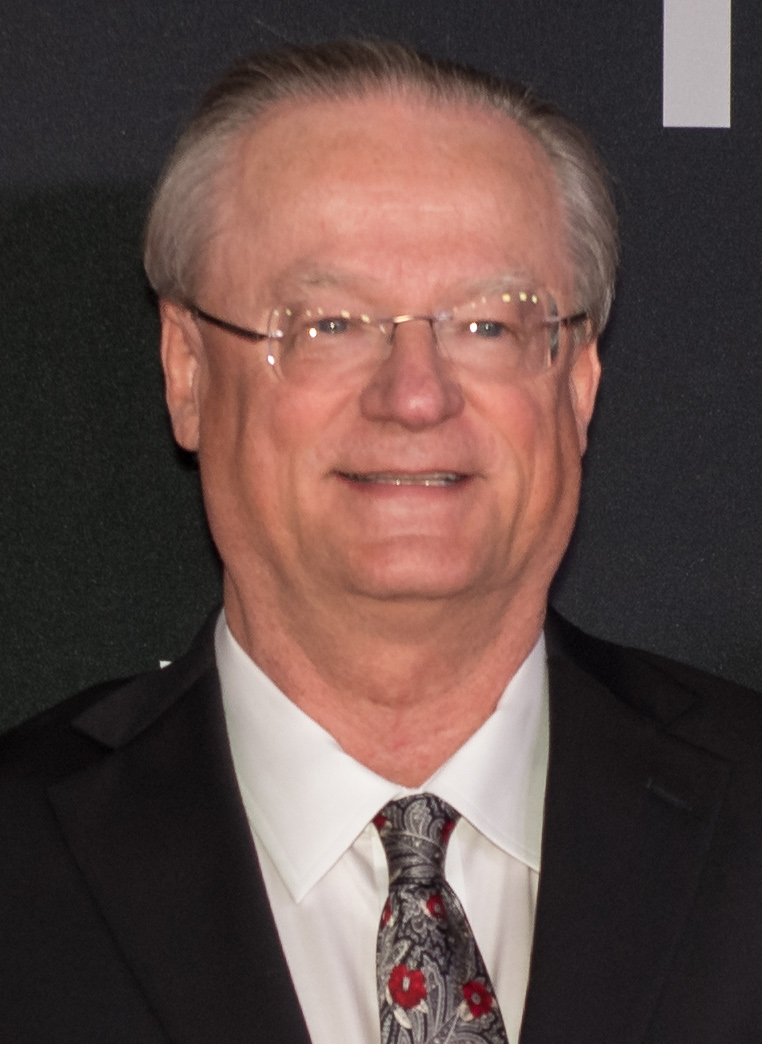
- James Hansen at the National Air and Space Museum Thursday, Oct. 4, 2018 in Washington, D.C..
- Born: 1952
- Alma mater: Indiana University Fort Wayne; Ohio State University
- Occupations: Academic, historian
- Writing career
- Language: English language
- Website: webhome.auburn.edu/~hansejr/

James R. Hansen (born June 12, 1952) is Professor Emeritus of history at Auburn University in Alabama. His book From the Ground Up won the History Book Award of the American Institute of Aeronautics and Astronautics in 1988. For his work, The Wind and Beyond (NASA) - (six-volume series), he was awarded the Eugene Ferguson Prize for Outstanding Reference Work by the Society for the History of Technology in 2005.

== Biography ==
Hansen is from Fort Wayne, Indiana. He received his B.A. from Indiana University Fort Wayne. He also received his M.A. and Ph.D. from Ohio State University. Hansen serves on the Leadership Board of For All Moonkind, Inc., a nonprofit organization committed to developing a legal framework to manage and protect human cultural heritage in space.

== Books ==
Books of non-fiction.

Biographies

- From the Ground Up: The Autobiography of an Aeronautical Engineer (1988), with Fred E. Weick
- First Man: The Life of Neil A. Armstrong (Simon & Schuster, 2005, 2012), authorized biography of Neil Armstrong, received the American Astronautical Society's Prize for Astronautical Literature.
- Forever Young: A Life of Adventure in Air and Space (2012), with John W. Young
- A Difficult Par: Robert Trent Jones Sr. and the Making of Modern Golf (Gotham Penguin, 2014). The book was awarded the Herbert Warren Wind Award by the United States Golf Association as the best golf book of the year.
- Completely Mad: Tom McClean, John Fairfax, and the Epic Race to Row Solo Across the Atlantic (2023)

Science

- The Bird Is on the Wing: Aerodynamics and the Progress of the American Airplane (Texas A&M University Press, 2003)

History

- Engineer In Charge: A History Of The Langley Aeronautical Laboratory, 1917 1958 (1987)
- Truth, Lies, and O-Rings: Inside the Space Shuttle Challenger Disaster (University Press of Florida, 2009), with Allan J. McDonald
- Enchanted Rendezvous: John C. Houbolt and the Genesis of the Lunar-Orbit Rendezvous Concept (1995), with National Aeronautics and Space Administration, Monograph in Aerospace History series #4
- Spaceflight Revolution: NASA Langley Research Center from Sputnik to Apollo (2013)

== Adaptations ==
- First Man (2018), film directed by Damien Chazelle, based on book First Man: The Life of Neil A. Armstrong
