= Robert Smith =

Robert, Bob or Bobby Smith, or variants thereof, may refer to:

== Business ==
- Robert MacKay Smith (1802–1888), Scottish businessman, meteorologist and philanthropist who founded Glasgow University's Mackay Smith Prizes
- Robert Barr Smith (1824–1915), Australian businessman and philanthropist
- Robert Hall Smith (1888–1960), American railroad executive, president of the Norfolk and Western Railway, 1946–1958
- Robert H. Smith (philanthropist) (1928–2009), American builder and developer who developed much of the Crystal City, Virginia neighborhood just south of Washington, D.C.
- Robert P. Smith (philanthropist) (1940–2019), American financial pioneer, philanthropist and author
- Robert Smith, Baron Smith of Kelvin (born 1944), British businessman, governor of the BBC
- Robert F. Smith (investor) (born 1962), American businessman and investor; founder, chairman, and CEO of Vista Equity Partners

== Entertainment ==
=== Acting ===
- Robert Wilton Smith (1881–1957), known as Robb Wilton, English comedian and comic actor
- Robert Smith (American actor) (1912–2001)
- Robert Grant Smith (1914–2001), American aeronautical engineer and actor after whom the R.G. Smith Award is named
- Robert O. Smith (1942–2010), American voice actor
- Robert Smith (Canadian actor) (1966–2020), Canadian actor and voice actor
- Bob Smith Junior, Ghanaian actor and director

=== Music ===
- Robert Archibald Smith (1780–1829), Scottish composer, known for his collection Scotish [sic] Minstrel, a selection from the vocal melodies of Scotland ancient and modern
- Robert Bache Smith (1875–1951), American librettist and lyricist
- Robert Curtis Smith (1930–2010), American Piedmont blues singer, guitarist and songwriter
- Bobby Smith (singer) (1936–2013), American musician, lead singer of the (Detroit) Spinners
- Robert Weston Smith (1938–1995), known as Wolfman Jack, American disc jockey famous for his gravelly voice
- Bob Smith (1942–1991), founder, singer, keyboardist and drummer for Cat Mother & the All Night Newsboys
- Robert Dean Smith (born 1956), American operatic tenor
- Robert W. Smith (musician) (1958–2023), American composer, arranger and teacher
- Robert Smith (musician) (born 1959), English musician, lead singer and guitarist of The Cure
- Robert L. Smith (sound engineer) (born 1965), American recording engineer and record producer in New York City
- Rob Smith (Irish musician) (born 1982), Irish singer-songwriter and DJ
- Rob Smith (British musician), English contemporary DJ, musician, and remixer
- Rob Sonic, American rapper and record producer

=== Writing ===
- Robert Paul Smith (1915–1977), American author
- Robert W. Smith (writer) (1926–2011), American martial artist and historian
- Robert Kimmel Smith (1930–2020), American novelist and children's author
- Bob Smith (born 1941), American author who wrote the memoir Hamlet's Dresser
- Rob Magnuson Smith, British-American novelist, short story writer, and university lecturer

=== Stage name ===
- Robert Emil Schmidt (1917–1998), nicknamed Buffalo Bob Smith, American host of TV show Howdy Doody
- Bob and Roberta Smith, pseudonym for British artist Patrick Brill (born 1963)

=== Other entertainment ===
- Robert Emmet Smith (1914–1988), American film art director and production designer
- Bob Smith (comics) (born 1951), American comic book inker
- Bob Smith (comedian) (1958–2018), American comedian and author
- Normal Bob Smith (born 1969), American graphic artist, writer, and atheist activist
- Robert Farrell Smith (born 1970), American humorist who writes children's books under the name Obert Skye
- Bob Smith (Atari), American video game developer and producer
- Bob Kupa'a Smith (1928–2020), American host of the television show Wordsmith

== History ==
- Robert Smith (professor) (1919–2009), expert on the history of the Yoruba people of Nigeria
- Robert Bruce Smith IV (1945–2014), American music and history expert
- Robert J. A. Smith (born 1951), vice-president of the Richmond Local History Society in Richmond, London
- Robert W. Smith (historian), scholar of history and the classics at the University of Alberta
- Robert Chester Smith (1912–1975), American art historian

== Journalism ==
- Robert Smith (journalist, born 1940), journalist for The New York Times
- Robert Smith (journalist, born 1967), correspondent for National Public Radio (NPR)
- Rob Smith (journalist), BBC South East TV presenter

== Law ==
- Robert Percy Smith (1770–1845), British lawyer, MP and judge advocate-general of Bengal, India
- Robert L. Smith (judge) (1918–1999), Nebraska Supreme Court judge
- Robert Ellis Smith (1940–2018), American attorney and author
- Robert S. Smith (born 1944), New York State Court of Appeals associate judge

== Military ==
- Robert A. Smith (1814–1879), birth name of British soldier and churchwarden Robert Smith-Dorrien
- Robert Smith (Medal of Honor) (1847–1930), American Indian Wars soldier and Medal of Honor recipient
- Robert Smith (Australian Army officer) (1881–1928), Australian wool merchant and army officer
- Robert H. Smith (naval officer) (1898–1943), US Navy submariner for whom the destroyer/minelayer USS Robert H. Smith was named
- Robert T. Smith (1918–1995), American World War II flying ace
- Robert G. Smith (colonel) (1854–1923), American colonel of the Spanish–American War

== Politics and government ==
=== Australia ===
- Robert Murray Smith (1831–1921), politician in colonial Victoria and agent-general for Victoria (Australia)
- Robert Burdett Smith (1837–1895), solicitor and politician in colonial New South Wales
- Robert Harrison Smith (1848–1911), member of both the Queensland Legislative Council and the Queensland Legislative Assembly
- Bob Rowland Smith (1925–2012), National Party member of the New South Wales Legislative Council
- Bob Smith (Australian politician) (born 1948), Labor member of the Victorian Legislative Council

=== Canada ===
- Robert Smith (Ontario politician) (1819–1900), Canadian member of parliament for Peel, Ontario
- Robert Smith (Canadian judge) (1858–1942), Canadian member of parliament for Stormont, justice of the Supreme Court of Canada
- Robert Hunter Smith (1876–1939), farmer and political figure in Nova Scotia
- Robert Smith (Newfoundland politician) (1879–1972), Newfoundland politician and merchant
- Robert Smith (British Columbia politician), Irish-born member of the Legislative Assembly of British Columbia (1871–1878)
- Robert Black Smith (1872–1931), member of the Legislative Assembly of New Brunswick 1917–1925
- Robert Knowlton Smith (1887–1973), Canadian member of parliament for Cumberland 1925–1935
- Robert Melville Smith (1887–1950), deputy minister of the Department of Highways of Ontario 1934–1943

=== New Zealand ===
- Robert William Smith (politician) (1871–1958), member of parliament

=== United Kingdom ===
- Robert Smith (MP for Wycombe), member of parliament (MP) for Wycombe from 1318 to 1322
- Robert Smith (MP for Derby), MP for Derby in 1420 and 1421
- Robert Smith (MP for Devizes) (fl. 1414–1421)
- Robert Smith (fl. 1545), MP for Carlisle
- Robert Smith, 1st Baron Carrington (1752–1838), MP for Nottingham
- Robert Percy Smith (1770–1845), British lawyer, MP and judge advocate-general of Bengal, India
- Robert Vernon, 1st Baron Lyveden (1800–1873), known as Robert Vernon Smith until 1859, British Liberal Party politician and MP
- Robert Smith (trade unionist) (1862–1934), general secretary of the National Union of Scottish Mineworkers and British Labour Party politician
- Sir Robert Smith, 1st Baronet (1880–1957), Scottish Unionist politician and MP for Aberdeen and Kincardine Central
- Robert Smith (colonial administrator) (1887–1959), British governor of North Borneo
- Sir Robert Smith, 3rd Baronet (born 1958), Liberal Democrat politician and MP for West Aberdeenshire and Kincardine
- Bobby Smith (activist) (born 1982), British political and fathers' rights activist

=== United States ===
- Robert Smith (Maryland politician) (1757–1842), secretary of state and of the Navy
- Robert Barnwell Smith (1800–1876), known as Robert Barnwell Rhett, U.S. senator and representative from South Carolina
- Robert Smith (Illinois politician) (1802–1867), U.S. representative from Illinois
- Robert Hardy Smith (1813–1878), Alabama politician and officer of the Confederate States Army during the American Civil War
- Robert A. Smith (mayor) (1827–1913), politician from Minnesota, mayor of St. Paul
- Robert Burns Smith (1854–1908), governor of Montana
- Robert Lloyd Smith (1861–1942), educator, businessman, and politician in the Texas Legislature
- Robert B. Smith (Virginia mayor), mayor of Newport News, Virginia 1956–1958
- Robert Solwin Smith (1924–2013), American ambassador to the Côte d'Ivoire
- Robert P. Smith (ambassador) (1929–2012), American diplomat
- Bob Smith (Oregon politician) (1931–2020), U.S. representative from Oregon
- Bob Smith (New Hampshire politician) (born 1941), U.S. senator from New Hampshire
- Bob Smith (New Jersey politician) (born 1947), New Jersey state senator
- Robert C. Smith (political scientist) (1947–2023), political science professor at San Francisco State University
- Robert J. Smith II (born 1963), American attorney and New Jersey state legislator

== Religion ==
- Robert Smith (bishop) (1732–1801), English-born American clergyman, planter and prelate of the Episcopal Church who served as the first bishop of the Diocese of South Carolina
- Robert Payne Smith (1818–1895), Regius Professor of Divinity at the University of Oxford and Dean of Canterbury
- Robert Pearsall Smith (1827–1899), lay leader in the Holiness movement in the US and the Higher Life movement in the UK
- Robert H. Smith (theologian) (1932–2006), American Lutheran clergyman, theologian, author and lecturer
- Robert Smith (priest) (1932–2010), American Catholic priest, author, and educator
- Robert P. Smith (pastor) (1863–1945), American educator, pastor, and writer

== Science, engineering and medicine ==
- Robert William Smith (surgeon) (1807–1873), Irish surgeon and pathologist
- Robert Angus Smith (1817–1884), Scottish chemist, discoverer of acid rain
- Robert Murdoch Smith (1835–1900), Scottish engineer, archaeologist and diplomat
- Robert Smith (surgeon) (1840–1885), Sierra Leonean medical doctor and the first African to become a Fellow of the Royal College of Surgeons of Edinburgh
- Bob Smith (doctor) (1879–1950), American physician and surgeon who co-founded Alcoholics Anonymous
- Robert Allan Smith (1909–1980), Scottish physicist
- Robert J. Smith (anthropologist) (1927–2016), Cornell University anthropologist
- Robert H. T. Smith (born 1935), Australian-Canadian professor of geography
- Robert L. Smith (academic), American engineer, academic and author
- Robert Smith (aerospace engineer), American business executive and aerospace engineer

== Sports ==
=== Association football ===
- Robert Smith (footballer, born 1848) (1848–1914), Scottish international footballer born in Aberdeen
- Robert Smith (Darwen footballer), English footballer for Darwen in the 1890s
- Bobby Smith (footballer, born 1870), English footballer born in Stoke-upon-Trent, Staffordshire
- Bobby Smith (footballer, born 1900s), Scottish footballer born in Kirkcaldy, Fife
- Robert Smith (footballer, born 1912), English football player and manager born in Atherton, Lancashire (now Greater Manchester)
- Bob Smith (footballer) (1923-?), English professional footballer born in Walkden, Lancashire (now Greater Manchester)
- Bobby Smith (footballer, born 1933) (1933–2010), English footballer born in Lingdale, North Yorkshire
- Bobby Smith (Irish footballer) (1922–1992), Irish football player
- Bobby Smith (Canadian soccer) (born 1940)
- Bobby Smith (footballer, born 1941) (1941–2019), English footballer born in Barnsley, South Yorkshire
- Bobby Smith (footballer, born 1944), English footballer and manager born in Prestbury, Cheshire
- Rob Smith (footballer, born 1950), English footballer born in Kingston upon Hull, East Riding of Yorkshire
- Bobby Smith (American soccer) (born 1951), American soccer player born in Trenton, New Jersey
- Bobby Smith (footballer, born 1953) (1953–2010), Scottish footballer born in Dalkeith, Midlothian
- Rob Smith (soccer) (born 1973), American soccer player born in Wilmington, Delaware

=== Australian rules football ===
- Bob Smith (Australian footballer, born 1877) (1877–1939), player for Fitzroy
- Bob Smith (Australian footballer, born 1906) (1906–1987), player for North Melbourne
- Rob Smith (Australian footballer) (1951–2013), player for North Melbourne

=== Gridiron football ===
- Bob Smith (defensive back, born 1925) (1925–2002), American football defensive back
- Bob Smith (fullback) (1929–2005), American football fullback
- Bob Smith (halfback) (1933–2014), American football halfback
- Bobby Smith (defensive back) (born 1938), American football defensive back
- Bob Smith (American football coach) (born 1940), college football coach
- Bobby Smith (running back) (born 1942), American football running back
- Bob Smith (defensive back, born 1945), American football defensive back
- Rob Smith (American football, born 1957), college football coach
- Rob Smith (Canadian football) (born 1958), Canadian football offensive lineman
- Robert Smith (defensive end) (born 1962), American football defensive end
- Robert Smith (running back) (born 1972), American football running back and sprinter
- Rob Smith (American football, born 1984)
- Robert Smith (safety) (born 1992), American football safety
- Robbie Smith (Canadian football) (born 1997), Canadian football defensive lineman

=== Baseball ===
- Bob Smith (catcher) (1907–unknown), Negro league baseball player
- Bob Smith (infielder) (born 1974), infielder for the Tampa Bay Devil Rays
- Bob Smith (pitcher, born 1890) (1890–1965), Major League Baseball (MLB) pitcher for the White Sox, 1913–1915
- Bob Smith (pitcher, born 1895) (1895–1987), MLB pitcher for the Braves, Cubs, and Reds, 1923–1937
- Bob Smith (pitcher, born 1928) (1928–2003), MLB pitcher for the Red Sox, Cubs, and Indians, 1958–1959
- Bob Smith (pitcher, born 1931) (1931–2013), MLB pitcher for the Red Sox, Cardinals, Pirates, and Tigers, 1955–1959
- Bobby Smith (baseball) (1934–2015), MLB outfielder, 1957–1965
- Robert Smith (baseball) (1936–2021), International Baseball Federation president; instrumental in baseball becoming an Olympic sport
- Rob Smith (baseball), American college baseball coach

=== Basketball ===
- Bobby Smith (basketball) (1937–2020), American basketball player
- Bingo Smith (1946–2023), American basketball player
- Robert Smith (basketball) (born 1955), American basketball player, NBA

=== Cricket ===
- Robert Smith (Australian cricketer) (1868–1927), played one first-class cricket match for Victoria in 1890
- Robert Smith (Derbyshire cricketer) (1848–1899), English cricketer; played first class cricket for Derbyshire 1871–84, captain 1876–83
- Robert Smith (South African cricketer) (1923–2001)
- Robert Smith (Wellington cricketer) (1946–2024), New Zealand cricketer
- Robert Smith (Otago cricketer) (born 1974), Australian cricketer who played in New Zealand
- Robert Smith (Cumberland cricketer) (born 1982), English cricketer; played for Cumberland in 2001

=== Equestrian sports ===
- Robert Augustus Smith (1869–1942), American racehorse trainer
- Robert Smith (equestrian) (born 1961), British Olympic equestrian

=== Hockey ===
- Bob Smith (ice hockey) (born 1946), Canadian minor pro hockey player
- Bobby Smith (ice hockey) (born 1958), all-star NHL hockey player
- Rob Smith (field hockey) (born 1961), Canadian field hockey Olympian
- Robbie Smith (field hockey), British field hockey player

=== Martial arts ===
- Robert Smith (boxer) (1908–?), South African Olympic boxer
- Robby Smith (born 1987), American Greco-Roman wrestler

=== Water sports ===
- Bob Smith (rower) (1909–1993), New Zealand rower
- Robert Smith (canoeist) (1929–2001), Canadian sprint canoer
- Robert J. Smith (sailor), in the 1973 Star World Championships

=== Other sports ===
- Bob Smith (coach) (1912–1994), American football, basketball, and baseball coach
- Robert Smith (bowler) (born 1974), American professional ten-pin bowler
- Bobby Smith (javelin thrower) (born 1982), American javelin thrower
- Rob Smith (racing driver) (born 1992), British racing driver
- Robbie Smith (rugby union) (born 1998), Scottish rugby union player
- Robert Smith (rugby union, born 1870) (1870–1904), Irish rugby union player
- Robert Smith (rugby union, born 1907) (1907–1958), Scottish rugby union player
- Robert Smith (sport shooter), English sport shooter
- Bobby Smith (pole vaulter), winner of the 1949 and 1950 NCAA DI outdoor pole vault championship
- Robert Smith (sprinter) (born 1972), American NCAA champion sprinter and football player
- Bob Smith (sprinter), American sprinter, 1948 200 m All-American for the Notre Dame Fighting Irish track and field team
- Bob Smith (sprinter, born 1921), American sprinter, 1942 and 1943 All-American for the Washington Huskies track and field team

== Other people ==
- Robert Smith (Oxford), 15th-century vice-chancellor of the University of Oxford
- Robert Smith (mathematician) (1689–1768), English mathematician and music theorist
- Robert Smith (architect) (1722–1777), American architect
- Robert Cross Smith (1795–1832), English astrologer
- Robert Benjamin Smith (1948–2024), American mass murderer
- Robert J. Smith, an Australian-Canadian mathematician who later changed their name to Stacey Smith?
- Robert W. Smith (chess player) (born 1956), New Zealand chess FIDE Master
- Robert Rowland Smith (born 1965), British lecturer, writer on various subjects such as philosophy, politics, psychology and art
- Robert Smith (murderer) (1849–1868), the last person to be publicly executed in Scotland

== Other uses ==
- USS Robert Smith, a Clemson-class destroyer in the US Navy
- USS Robert H. Smith, a Robert H. Smith-class destroyer minelayer in the US Navy

== See also ==
- Robert Smyth (disambiguation)
- Robert H. Smith School of Business, University of Maryland business school
- Robert Smit (died 1977), murdered South African politician
- Roberts-Smith (disambiguation)
