= Robert M. Smith =

Robert M. Smith may refer to:

- Robert MacKay Smith (1802–1888), Scottish businessman, meteorologist, and philanthropist
- Robert Melville Smith (fl. 1931–1943), deputy minister of the Ontario Department of Highways
- Robert Murdoch Smith (1835–1900), Scottish engineer, archaeologist and diplomat
- Robert Murray Smith (1831–1921), Australian politician
- Robert M. Smith, an inductee from the Canadian Mining Hall of Fame

== See also ==
- Robert Smith (disambiguation)
