= Robert B. Smith =

Robert B. Smith may refer to:

- Robert B. Smith (Virginia mayor) (fl. mid-20th century), American politician
- Robert Bache Smith (1875–1951), American librettist and lyricist
- Robert Barr Smith (1824–1915), Australian businessman and philanthropist
- Robert Benjamin Smith (born 1962), American football player
- Robert Benjamin Smith (1948–2024), American mass murderer
- Robert Bert Smith, American football defensive back
- Robert Black Smith (1872–1931), member of the Legislative Assembly of New Brunswick
- Robert Bruce Smith IV (1945–2014), American music and history expert
- Robert Burdett Smith (1837–1895), solicitor and politician in colonial New South Wales
- Robert Burns Smith (1854–1908), American politician, Governor of Montana

== See also ==
- Robert Barnwell Smith (1800–1876), known as Robert Barnwell Rhett, U.S. Senator and Representative from South Carolina
- Robert Benedict Seymour Smith (1909–1993), New Zealand rower
- Robert Smith (disambiguation)
