= Stan Stokes =

American Aviation artist and historic aircraft painter

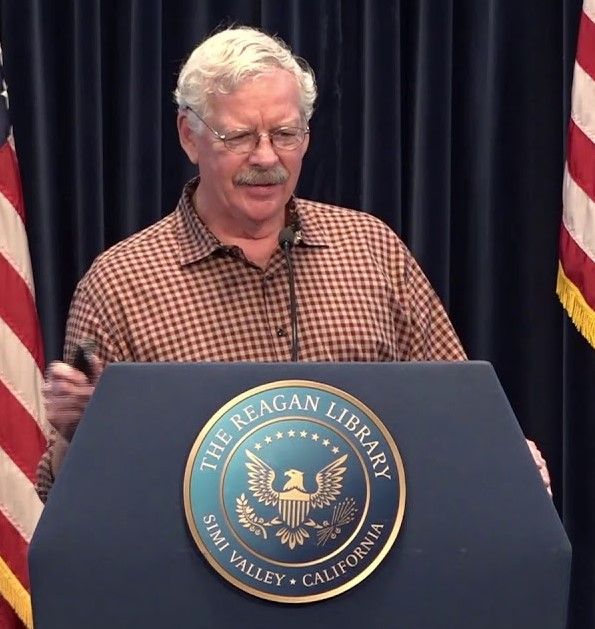
- Stan Stokes at the Ronald Reagan Presidential Library
- Born: 1950 (age 75–76)
- Notable work: History of the Flying White House, Tuskegee Airmen Mural, History of Air Force One. See website for more.
- Awards: Benedictine Art Awards; 1975 1st place National Air and Space Museum "Golden Age of Flight" Art Competition; 1985 1st place National Museum of Naval Aviation; 2000 R.G. Smith Award
- Website: stanstokes.art

Stan Stokes is an American painter known for his aviation art. His work hangs in three presidential libraries.

Since the mid-1980s NASA has commissioned Stokes to paint 15 works ranging from the Space Shuttles to the SR-71 Blackbird. Stokes has also painted numerous works for Burt Rutan. Stokes's works hang in the Air Force art collection, the United States Air Force Academy, The Pentagon, the San Diego Air & Space Museum, the Palm Springs Air Museum, the National Museum of Naval Aviation, and the Smithsonian's National Air and Space Museum.

His work encompasses portraits, landscapes, aviation and space, ships, cars and his new collection of cat-related fine art paintings. Stokes's art has been published in numerous books and periodicals.

== Background ==
Stan Stokes is an American aviation artist known for his detailed paintings of historic aircraft and aviation events. Born and raised in Southern California, he developed a passion for aviation early, growing up near Brackett Field in La Verne and the precursor to the Planes of Fame Air Museum in Chino. He earned his pilot's license locally and also pursued model airplane building and drawing, interests that would later shape his career.

Stokes became interested in art in college, where a beginner's art class sparked a lasting interest in painting. After several years exhibiting at street shows across the Western United States, he gained recognition in galleries for his intimate landscapes. Combining his love of art and aviation, he purchased a 7KCAB Citabria, learning aerobatics and taildragger flight, and in 1977 transitioned to aviation-themed artwork.

By 1980, Stokes was working full-time as an aviation artist, producing limited edition prints co-signed by notable figures such as General Jimmy Doolittle, Chuck Yeager, Pappy Boyington, the Flying Tigers, and the Tuskegee Airmen. His work has been associated with prominent collections, including the Palm Springs Air Museum, where he became closely involved in the preservation and documentation of historic aircraft.

In 1984, Stokes won first place in the Smithsonian National Air and Space Museum's "Golden Age of Flight" art competition with a painting of Jimmie Mattern's Lockheed 12A Electra Jr. He continues to live in the Palm Desert, California area with his wife, Joan.

== Works ==
=== Tuskegee Airmen ===
The Tuskegee Airmen were pioneering African American pilots and support crews in World War II who broke both enemy lines and racial barriers. Trained at Alabama's Tuskegee Army Airfield, they flew thousands of missions escorting bombers, earning acclaim for their skill and courage. Their achievements challenged military segregation and helped advance civil rights, leaving a lasting legacy of heroism and pride.

In 1998, Bob Williams commissioned artist Stan Stokes to create a memorial mural honoring the Airmen. Work began in 2000 and was completed a year later. The mural was displayed at Los Angeles International Airport before returning to the Palm Springs Air Museum, where it remains permanently. Based on WWII photographs of the Airmen—many of whom witnessed its creation—the mural preserves their legacy. After Williams passed away, Stokes continues to honor the Tuskegee Airmen through his art, books, and lectures.

Stokes is working on a book honoring the Tuskegee Airmen. Many of his Tuskegee Airmen paintings are available on his website, with a brief biography of each subject.

=== Presidential Libraries ===
Stokes has created artwork for three Presidential Libraries. He has also worked on art projects with the 89th Airlift Wing (the Air Force One personnel). The Palm Springs Air Museum has a couple of Stokes's larger paintings honoring the "History of Air Force One" and the "History of Presidential Helicopters".

Stokes's 12-foot-by-120-foot mural of the "History of the Flying White House" is on permanent display in the new Air Force One Pavilion of the Ronald Reagan Presidential Library. In addition, Stokes's painting of the USS Ronald Reagan is hanging in the library's Legacy Room.

The George Bush Presidential Library in College Station, Texas, has two paintings by Stokes on permanent display. Both are of the USS George H.W. Bush (CVN-77), our nation's next aircraft carrier.

The Gerald R. Ford Presidential Library houses two of his works, the first of which depicts the future aircraft carrier the USS Gerald R. Ford (CVN-78). The second painting is of the USS Monterey (CVL-26), the carrier on which young Ford served with distinction in World War II.

=== Selected works ===
- 1934 American Classics
- Gotcha
- Off to the Turkey Shoot
- Sirens of Death
- Slashed by a Sabre
- Top Cover

== Awards ==
- 1975: 1st place, Benedictine Art Awards
- 1985: 1st place, National Air and Space Museum's "Golden Age of Flight" art competition
- 2000: R.G. Smith Award, National Museum of Naval Aviation
