= Wordsmith =

Wordsmith may refer to:

- A writer, a person who uses written words to communicate meaning
- Wordsmith, an AI platform by Automated Insights
- WordSmith (software), a collection of corpus linguistics tools
- Wordsmith (TV series), an instructional television series
- Wordsmith.org, a linguistics website founded by Anu Garg
- The Wordsmith, a 1979 Canadian television film directed by Claude Jutra
- Kenny Wordsmith or Ashok Rajagopalan, Indian children's book author and illustrator
