= Robert G. Smith =

Robert G. Smith may refer to:

- R.G. Smith Award
- Robert G. Smith (aviator)
- Robert G. Smith (colonel) (1854-1923), American colonel of the Spanish–American War
- Robert G. Smith, educator, see Libby Garvey
- Robert G. Smith, candidate in the United States House of Representatives elections, 1968
