= List of AFC Telford United seasons =

AFC Telford United is a football club based in Telford, Shropshire, England. The club was formed in 2004 after the original Telford United F.C., founded in 1872, folded due to financial problems. They are currently members of the National League North and play at the New Bucks Head in Wellington, part of the new town of Telford.

== Key ==
Top scorer and number of goals scored shown in bold when he was also top scorer for the division.

**Key to league record**: Lvl = Level of the league in the current league system; S = Numbers of seasons; Pld = Games played; W = Games won; D = Games drawn; L = Games lost; GF = Goals for; GA = Goals against; GD = Goals difference; Pts = Points; Position = Position in the final league table; Overall position = Overall club position in the English league system	**Key to cup records**: PR = Premilinary round; QR1 = Qualifying round 1; QR2 = Qualifying round 2; QR3 = Qualifying round 3; QR4 = Qualifying round 4; R1 = Round 1; R2 = Round 2; R3 = Round 3; R4 = Round 4; R5 = Round 5; R6 = Round 6; QF = Quarter-finals; SF = Semi-finals; RU = Runners-up; W = Winners

== Seasons ==
Season	Division	Tier	Pld	W	D	L	GF	GA	GD	Pts	Pos	Notes	Leading league goalscorer	FA Cup	FA Trophy	Manager
2004–05	Northern Premier League Division One	8	42	23	11	8	78	44	34	80	**3rd of 22**	**Promoted through playoffs**		PR	PR	Bernard McNally
2005–06	Northern Premier League Premier	7	42	14	17	11	54	52	2	59	10th of 22			QR2	QR3	Bernard McNally; Rob Smith
2006–07	Northern Premier League Premier	7	42	21	15	6	72	40	32	78	**3rd of 22**	**Promoted through playoffs**		QR1	QR1	Rob Smith
2007–08	Conference North	6	42	24	8	10	70	43	27	80	2nd of 22	Lost in playoff semi finals		QR2	R1	Rob Smith
2008–09	Conference North	6	42	22	10	10	65	34	31	76	4th of 22	Lost in playoff final		R1	SF	Rob Smith
2009–10	Conference North	6	40	14	9	17	52	55	-3	51	11th of 21			R1	QR3	Rob Smith
2010–11	Conference North	6	40	23	13	4	71	29	42	82	**2nd of 21**	**Promoted through playoffs**		QR3	R3	Andy Sinton
2011–12	Conference Premier	5	46	10	16	20	45	65	-20	46	20th of 24		Chris Sharp (10)	R1	R2	Andy Sinton
2012–13	Conference Premier	5	46	6	17	23	52	79	-27	35	**24th of 24**	**Relegated**	Steve Jones (10)	QR4	R2	Andy Sinton; Mark Cooper (interim); Graham Hyde; John Psaras (caretaker)
2013–14	Conference North	6	42	25	10	7	82	53	29	85	**1st of 22**	**Promoted as champions**	Adam Farrell (16)	QR2	R1	Liam Watson
2014–15	National League	5	46	10	9	27	58	84	-26	36	**23rd of 24**	**Relegated**	Tony Gray (18)	R2	R2	Liam Watson; Steve Kittrick
2015–16	National League North	6	42	13	8	21	47	60	-13	47	18th of 22		Josh Wilson (8)	QR2	R1	Steve Kittrick; Rob Smith
2016–17	National League North	6	42	10	12	20	38	57	-19	42	17th of 22		Lee Hughes (16)	QR2	R1	Rob Smith
2017–18	National League North	6	42	16	5	21	55	69	-14	53	14th of 22		Marcus Dinanga (16)	R1	R1	Rob Edwards
2018–19	National League North	6	42	17	14	11	64	55	9	65	8th of 22		Dan Udoh (19)	QR3	SF	Gavin Cowan
2019–20	National League North	6	34	11	9	14	51	56	-5	42	14th of 22	Season curtailed due to COVID-19 pandemic	Marcus Dinanga (12)	QR2	R1	Gavin Cowan
2020–21	National League North	6	17	5	4	8	17	23	-6	19	Abandoned	Season abandoned due to COVID-19 pandemic	Jason Oswell (5)	QR3	R3	Gavin Cowan
2021–22	National League North	6	42	7	16	19	48	65	-17	37	20th of 22		Jason Oswell (13)	QR2	R3	Gavin Cowan; Dennis Greene (interim); Paul Carden
2022–23	National League North	6	46	6	14	26	35	76	-41	32	**24th of 24**	**Relegated**	Montel Gibson (8)	QR2	R3	Paul Carden; Kevin Wilkin
2023–24	South League Premier Central	7	40	24	10	6	69	34	35	82	2nd of 21	Lost in playoff final	Montel Gibson (17)	QR1	QR3	Kevin Wilkin
2024–25	Southern League Premier Central	7	42	19	17	6	82	60	22	74	**3rd of 22**	**Promoted through playoffs**	**Matty Stenson (32)**	QR1	R2	Kevin Wilkin
2025–26	National League North	6	42	17	14	15	85	65	20	65	11th of 22		Matty Stenson (17)	R1	R5	Kevin Wilkin
