= Robert Smyth =

Robert Smyth (or Smythe) may refer to:

- Robert Brough Smyth (1830–1899), Australian geologist, author, and social commentator
- Sir Robert Smyth, 3rd Baronet, MP for Andover (UK Parliament constituency)
- Sir Robert Smyth, 5th Baronet (1744–1802), MP for Colchester
- Robert Smyth (American politician) (1814–1898), Irish-born American politician in Iowa
- Robert Smyth (Oxford), 15th-century Vice-Chancellor of the University of Oxford
- Several of the Smyth baronets
- Robert Smyth Academy, upper school in Market Harborough, Leicestershire, England
- Robert Sparrow Smythe (1833–1917), Australian journalist, newspaper editor/owner, and theatrical manager

== See also ==
- Rob Smyth (born 1977), English rugby league player
- Robert Smith (disambiguation)
