= David W. Mersereau =

Canadian politician

Member of the Legislative Assembly of New Brunswick
- In office 1917–1925 Serving with Robert Black Smith
- Constituency: Sunbury

Personal details
- Born: February 16, 1868 Fredericton Junction, New Brunswick
- Died: December 13, 1958 (aged 90) Fredericton Junction, New Brunswick
- Party: New Brunswick Liberal Association
- Spouse: Maggie Drum (m. 1896)
- Children: 5
- Occupation: Farmer

David Wellington Mersereau (February 16, 1868 – December 13, 1958) was a Canadian politician. He served in the Legislative Assembly of New Brunswick from 1917 to 1925 as member of the Liberal party. He died in 1958, aged 90.
