= A and T Recovery =

American aircraft salvage company

- Industry: Aircraft salvage
- Founded: 1988
- Founder: Allan Olson and Taras Lyssenko
- Website: atrecovery.com

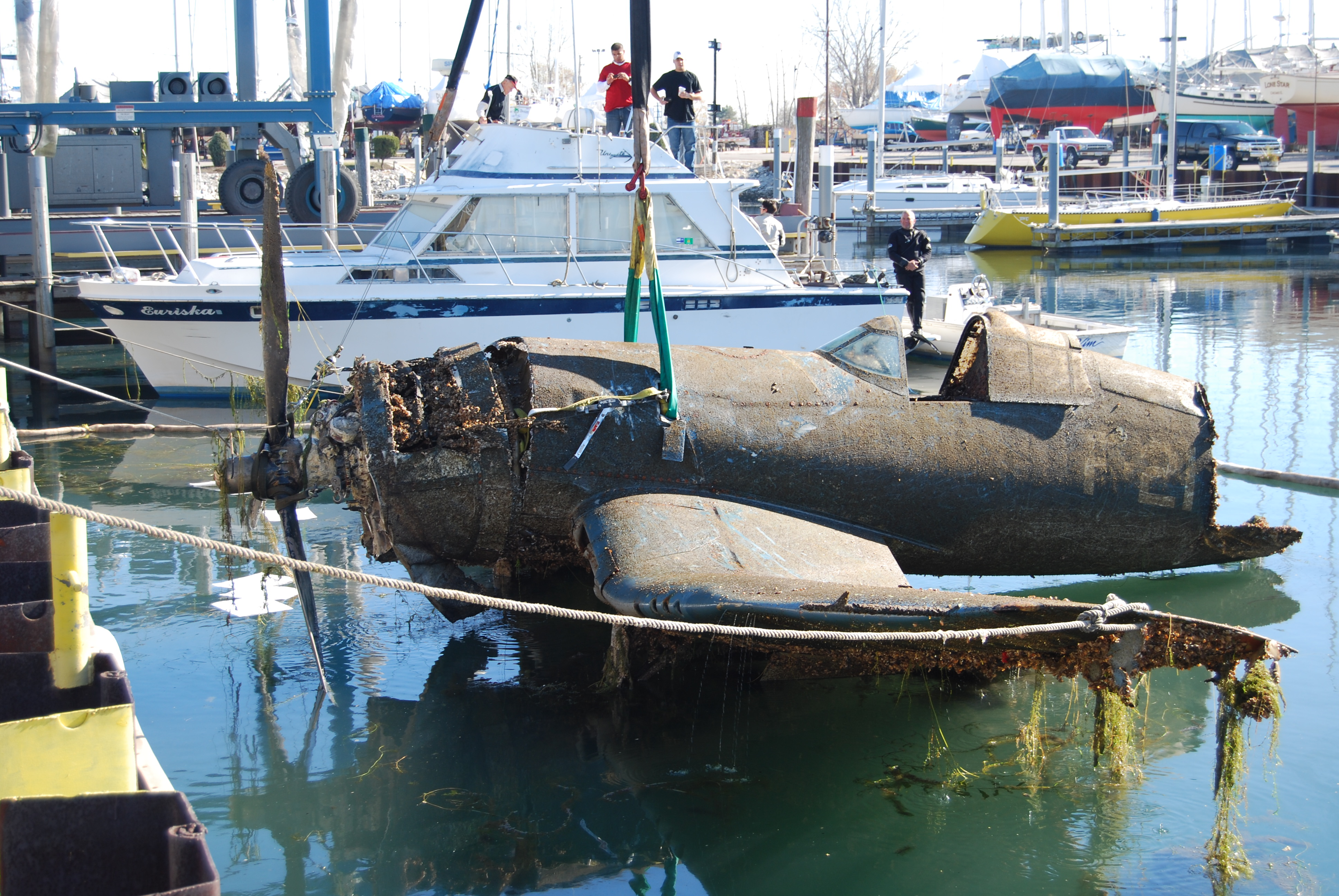
Vought F4U-1 "Bird Cage" Corsair Bureau Number 02465 being lifted from Lake Michigan by A and T Recovery.

A and T Recovery (Allan Olson and Taras Lyssenko) is an American company that has the primary purpose to locate and recover once lost World War II United States Navy aircraft for presentation to the American public. They have recovered nearly forty such aircraft, mainly from Lake Michigan. The aircraft were lost during the aircraft carrier qualification conducted out of the former Naval Air Station Glenview that was located north of Chicago, Illinois. The Navy had used two ships, the USS Wolverine (IX-64) and the USS Sable (IX-81), to qualify thousands of pilots.

== History ==
A and T Recovery began their recovery efforts in the 1980s. As part of the aircraft collection of the US Navy, the aircraft they retrieved are managed by the National Naval Aviation Museum, which is under the direction of the Naval History and Heritage Command.

== Funding ==
10 USC § 2572 (b), a section of United States Code, allows the Museums of the US Department of Defense to exchange condemned and/or obsolete military material for similar materials, equipment, search and recovery services, restoration services, and educational programs.

During the 1990s, the Director of the National Naval Aviation Museum used this section in law to fund the work of the firm along with the restoration of the rescued aircraft. The aircraft located and recovered over the recent years have been funded by private donations thru the Naval Aviation Museum Foundation, Inc. which oversees the contracting for all activities of the effort.

== Lake Michigan projects ==
Historically significant U.S. Navy aircraft recovered include the Douglas SBD Dauntless Dive Bomber Bureau Number 2106 which survived the Japanese attack on Pearl Harbor and the Battle of Midway, the only Vought SB2U Vindicator Scout-Bomber known to exist, the Grumman F6F Hellcat Fighter Bureau Number 25910, and an extremely rare early "Bird Cage" Vought F4U-1 Corsair.

Some of their other rescued aircraft include:

- Vought F4U-1 Corsair 02465 National Naval Aviation Museum

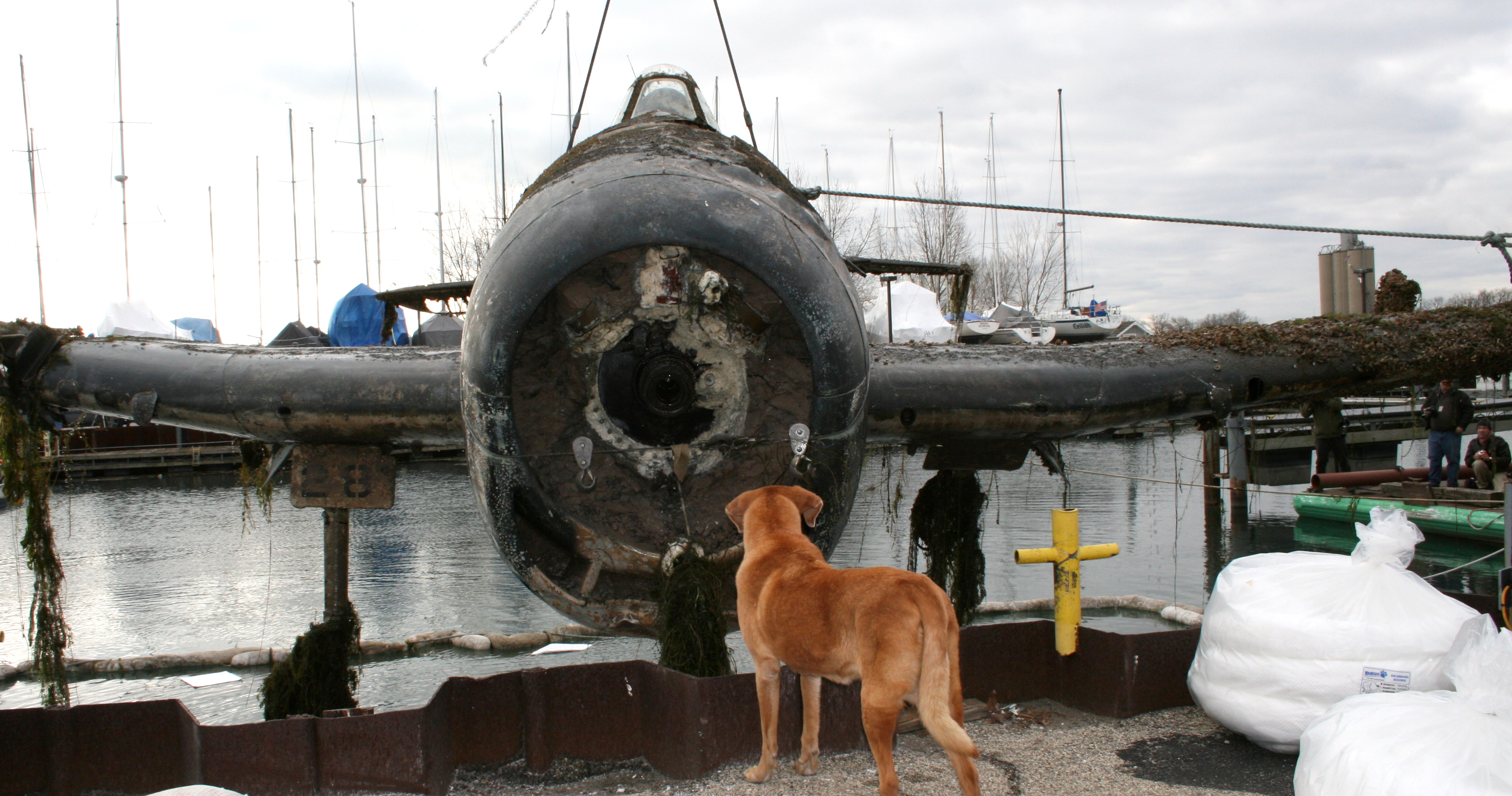
Grumman F6F-3 Hellcat Bureau Number 25910 during recovery from Lake Michigan by A and T Recovery.

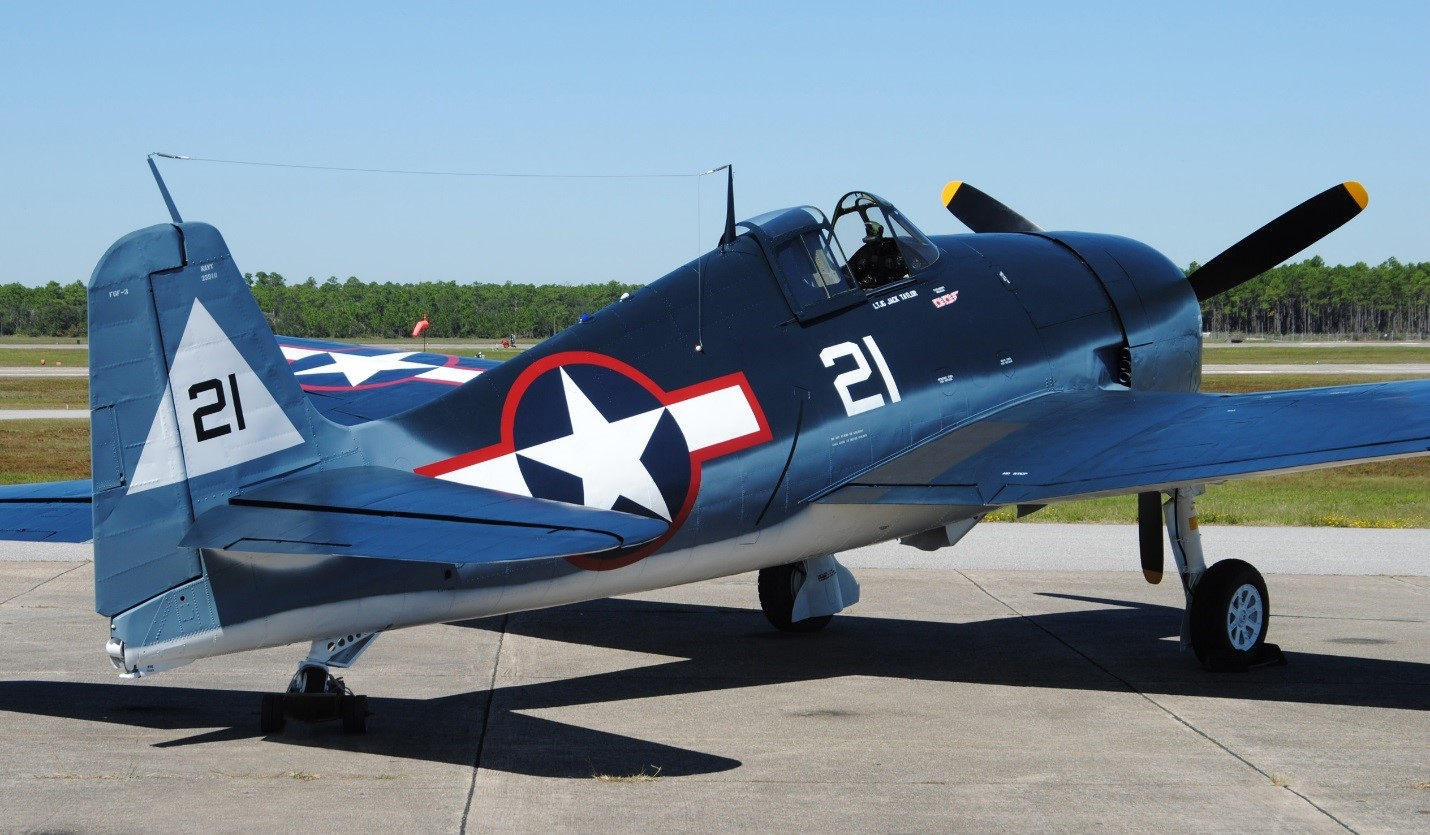
Grumman F6F-3 Hellcat Bureau Number 25910 on display at the National Naval Aviation Museum.

- Grumman F6F-3 Hellcat 25910 National Naval Aviation Museum
- Vought SB2U-2 Vindicator 1383 National Naval Aviation Museum

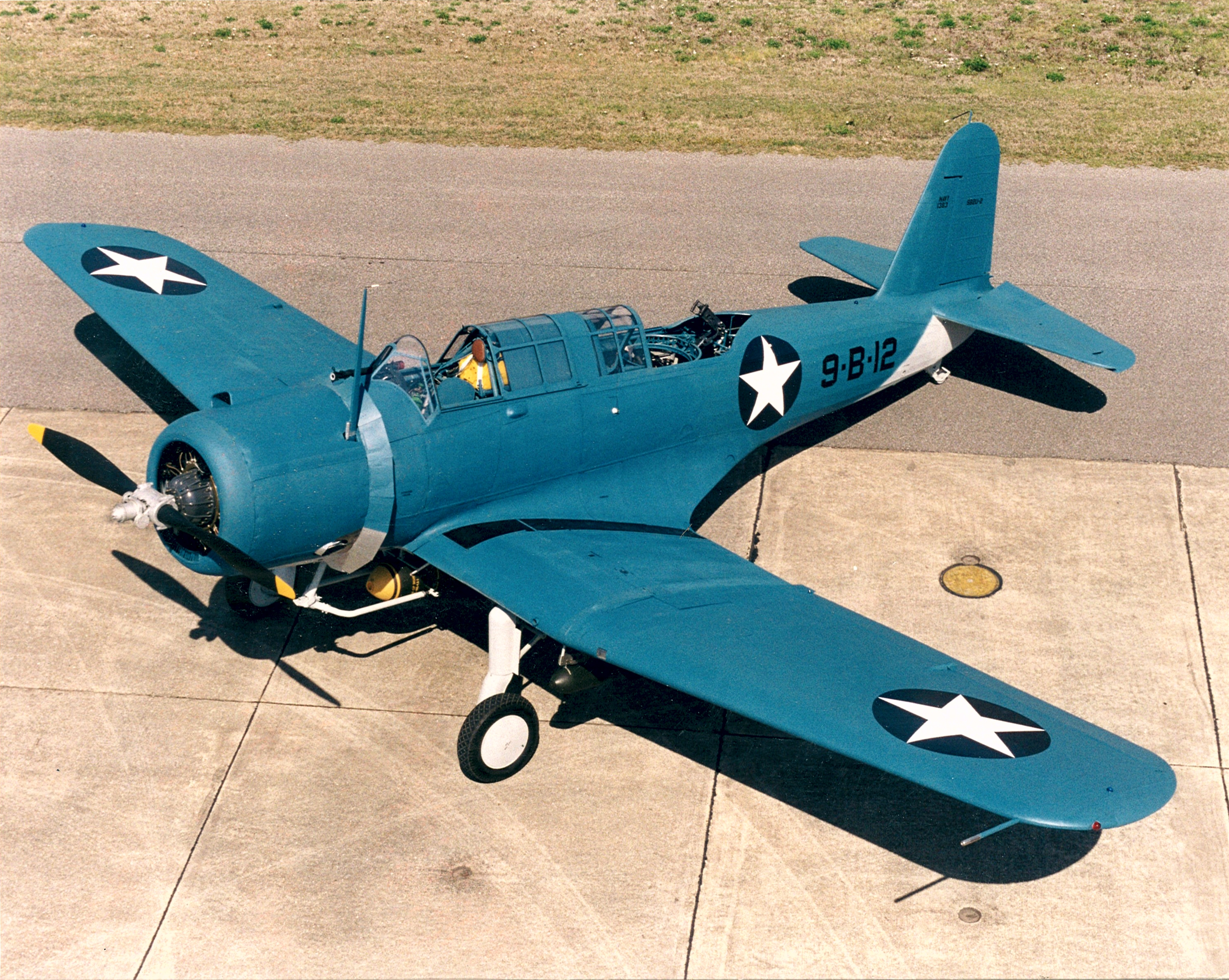
The only known to exist Vought SB2U-2 Vindicator Bureau Number 1383 on display at the National Naval Aviation Museum. Recovered by A and T Recovery from Lake Michigan in 1990.

- Douglas SBD-2 Dauntless 2106 (Midway Madness) National Naval Aviation Museum
- Grumman F4F-3 Wildcat 4039 National Naval Aviation Museum
- General Motors FM-2 Wildcat 55052 USS Hornet Sea, Air & Space Museum
- Grumman F4F-3 Wildcat 12320 City of Chicago O'Hare International Airport
- Douglas SBD-4 Dauntless 10575 City of Chicago Midway Airport
- Grumman F4F-3 Wildcat 12297 Cradle of Aviation Museum
- Grumman TBF-1 Avenger 01747 Naval Air Station DeLand museum
- General Motors FM-2 Wildcat 16278 Hickory Aviation Museum, formerly at Flying Leatherneck Aviation Museum
- Douglas SBD-3 Dauntless 06624 Air Zoo
- General Motors FM-2 Wildcat 57039 American Heritage Museum; restored by the Air Zoo
- General Motors FM-2 Wildcat 74161 National Museum of the Pacific War
- Douglas SBD-3 Dauntless 06508 National World War II Museum
- Douglas SBD-5 Dauntless 36177 American Heritage Museum, formerly at Pearl Harbor Aviation Museum
- Douglas SBD-5 Dauntless 36176 Palm Springs Air Museum
- Douglas SBD-5 Dauntless 36173 Patriots Point Naval and Maritime Museum, USS Yorktown (CV-10)
- Douglas SBD-4 Dauntless 06900 San Diego Air and Space Museum
- Grumman F4F-3 Wildcat 11828 San Diego Air and Space Museum
- Douglas SBD-3 Dauntless 06583 National Museum of the Marine Corps
- Douglas SBD-3 Dauntless 06694 USS Lexington Museum
- Douglas SBD-1 Dauntless 1612 Air Zoo, formerly at Flying Leatherneck Aviation Museum
- Grumman F4F-3 Wildcat 12290 USS Midway Museum
- General Motors FM-1 Wildcat 14994 Valiant Air Command Warbird Museum

Along with aircraft, the firm has also located shipwrecks; the most notable is the German Type UC III submarine SM UC-97, a World War I U-boat. At the end of World War I the German Navy was forced to surrender many of their war ships to the World War I Allies. The records indicate that as many as 172 submarines (U-boats, Unterseeboote) were surrendered. Many of these vessels were brought to Harwich, England, then "allocated" or "assigned" to the different Allied countries, with 6 going to the United States of America. The UC-97 was one of these vessels; she was brought to the US and toured the Great Lakes under the command of Charles A. Lockwood. He detailed his experience with the submarine in his book Down To the Sea in Subs, My Life in the U.S. Navy.

On the morning of June 7, 1921 the UC-97 was sunk by the training ship U.S.S. Wilmette, formerly the Eastland. The firm located the resting point of the vessel in 1992.

=== Thomas Hume shipwreck ===
The Thomas Hume was a Great Lakes schooner used to carry lumber. She left Chicago May 21, 1891, but never arrived at the destination port. The firm located her nearly intact about fifteen miles off of Chicago.

=== Early Holocene Forest (Olson Site) ===
The most unusual find of the firm is the Early Holocene Forest. In 1989, while searching for aircraft in southern Lake Michigan the firm located a number of tree stumps intact on the lake's floor. The stumps were the remains of a deciduous forest that radiocarbon dating showed to be over 8,000 years old.

== Beyond Lake Michigan ==
=== San Diego TBD Devastator ===
One of the sought after historic aircraft that there is a desire to be added to the collection of the National Naval Aviation Museum is the Douglas TBD Devastator. The firm located one of these aircraft, TBD-1 BuNo.0377, lost off the San Diego coast.

=== San Diego SB2C Helldiver ===
In 2009, a sport fisherman, Duane Johnson, saw an airplane on his fish finding electronics while traversing Lower Otay Reservoir. The airplane was a Curtiss SB2C Helldiver that had ditched in the reservoir because of engine failure while conducting dive bombing practice toward the end of World War II. In August 2010 the firm, with the support of San Diego Park Rangers, removed the aircraft and delivered it to the National Naval Aviation Museum where it awaits restoration and public display.

=== D. Blan Stewart ===
On the afternoon of October 31, 1988, D. Blan Stewart, flying a Piper Archer single engine aircraft, disappeared over Lake Martin, Alabama. Soon after, the FBI began a manhunt believing he had faked his death to avoid prosecution. In November 1990 A and T Recovery located the aircraft at the bottom of Lake Martin; Stewart's remains were in the cockpit.

== Film ==
In 2012, the Pritzker Military Museum and Library produced, for WTTW Chicago, an episode of "Citizen Soldier," where a major portion of the program examines Lyssenko's life work in recovering lost Navy World War II aircraft from Lake Michigan.
