= SM UC-97 =

German World War I submarine sunk in Lake Michigan

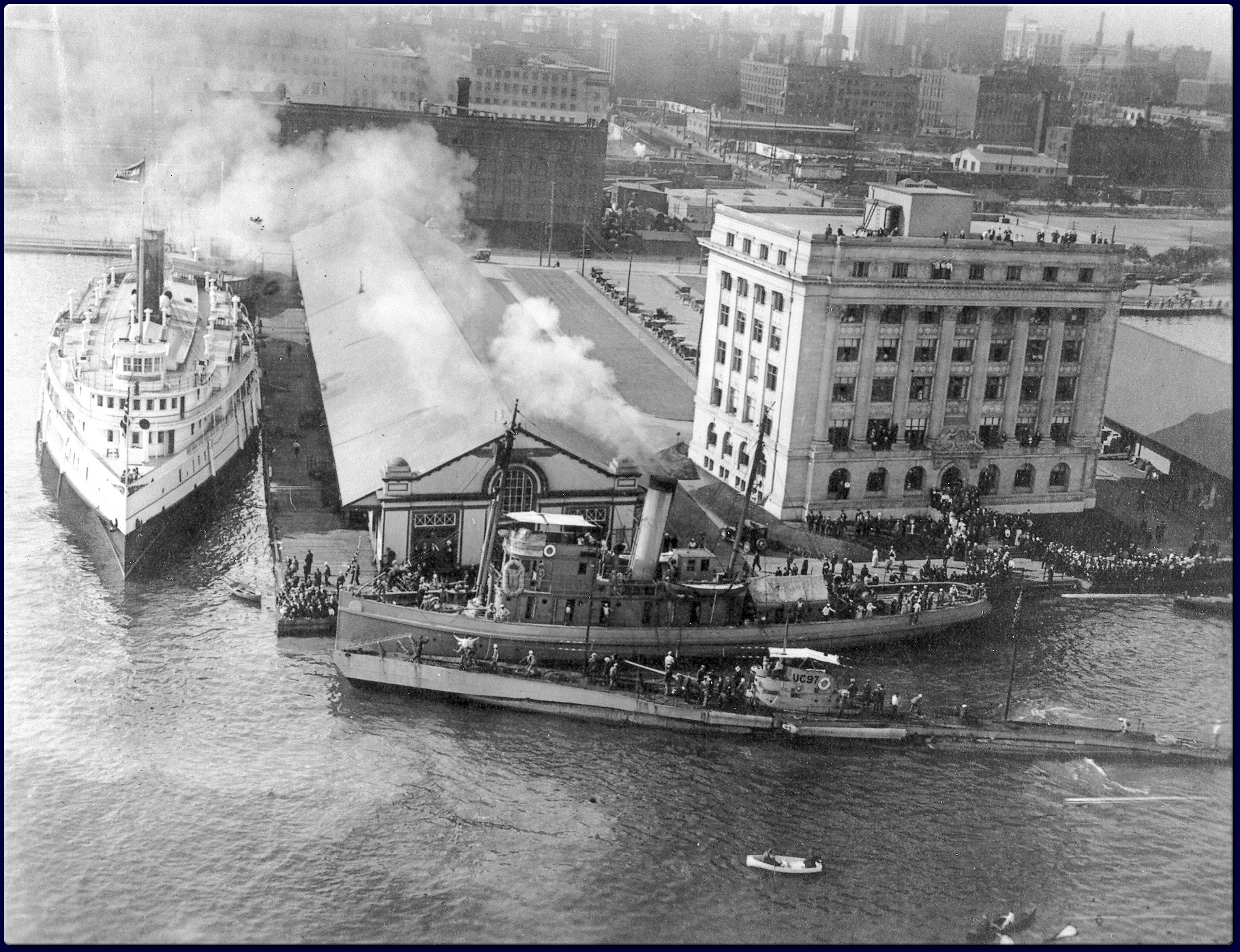
- UC-97 at Toronto, 1919

History

German Empire
- Name: UC-97
- Ordered: 12 January 1916
- Builder: Blohm & Voss, Hamburg
- Yard number: 331
- Launched: 17 March 1918
- Commissioned: 3 September 1918
- Fate: Surrendered, 22 November 1918; sunk as target in Lake Michigan, 7 June 1921

General characteristics
- Class & type: Type UC III submarine
- Displacement: 491 t (483 long tons), surfaced; 571 t (562 long tons), submerged
- Length: 56.51 m (185 ft 5 in) (o/a); 42.20 m (138 ft 5 in) (pressure hull)
- Beam: 5.54 m (18 ft 2 in) (o/a)
- Draft: 3.77 m (12 ft 4 in)
- Propulsion: 2 × propeller shafts; 2 × 6-cylinder, 4-stroke diesel engines, 600 PS (440 kW; 590 bhp); 2 × electric motors, 770 PS (570 kW; 760 shp)
- Speed: 11.5 knots (21.3 km/h; 13.2 mph), surfaced; 6.6 knots (12.2 km/h; 7.6 mph), submerged
- Range: 9,850 nautical miles (18,240 km; 11,340 mi) at 7 knots (13 km/h; 8.1 mph), surfaced; 40 nmi (74 km; 46 mi) at 4.5 knots (8.3 km/h; 5.2 mph), submerged
- Test depth: 75 m (246 ft)
- Complement: 32
- Armament: 6 × 100 cm (39.4 in) mine tubes; 14 × UC 200 mines; 3 × 50 cm (19.7 in) torpedo tubes (2 bow external; one stern); 7 × torpedoes; 1 x 10.5 cm (4.1 in) SK L/45 or 8.8 cm (3.5 in) Uk L/30 deck gun
- Notes: 15-second diving time

Service record
- Commanders: Oblt. Walter Wiedemann; 6 September – 11 November 1918
- Operations: None
- Victories: None

SM UC-97 was a German Type UC III minelaying submarine or U-boat in the German Imperial Navy (German: Kaiserliche Marine) during World War I.

== Design ==
A Type UC III submarine, UC-97 had a displacement of 491 tonnes (483 long tons) when at the surface and 571 tonnes (562 long tons) while submerged. She had a length overall of 56.51 m (185 ft 5 in), a beam of 5.54 m (18 ft 2 in), and a draught of 3.77 m (12 ft 4 in). The submarine was powered by two six-cylinder four-stroke diesel engines each producing 300 metric horsepower (220 kW; 300 shp) (a total of 600 metric horsepower (440 kW; 590 shp)), two electric motors producing 770 metric horsepower (570 kW; 760 shp), and two propeller shafts. She had a dive time of 15 seconds and was capable of operating at a depth of 75 metres (246 ft).

The submarine was designed for a maximum surface speed of 11.5 knots (21.3 km/h; 13.2 mph) and a submerged speed of 6.6 knots (12.2 km/h; 7.6 mph). When submerged, she could operate for 40 nautical miles (74 km; 46 mi) at 4.5 knots (8.3 km/h; 5.2 mph); when surfaced, she could travel 9,850 nautical miles (18,240 km; 11,340 mi) at 7 knots (13 km/h; 8.1 mph). UC-97 was fitted with six 100 centimetres (39 in) mine tubes, fourteen UC 200 mines, three 50 centimetres (20 in) torpedo tubes (one on the stern and two on the bow), seven torpedoes, and one 10.5 cm (4.1 in) SK L/45 or 8.8 cm (3.5 in) Uk L/30 deck gun . Her complement was twenty-six crew members.

== Construction ==
The U-boat was ordered on 12 January 1916 and was launched on 17 March 1918. She was commissioned into the German Imperial Navy on 3 September 1918 as SM UC-97. (Note: "SM" stands for "Seiner Majestät" (English: His Majesty's) and combined with the U for Unterseeboot would be translated as His Majesty's Submarine.) As with the rest of the completed UC III boats, UC-97 conducted no war patrols and sank no ships.

== United States Navy ==
She was surrendered on 22 November 1918 to the United States. UC-97 formed the Ex-German Submarine Expeditionary Force with SM U-111, SM U-117, SM U-140, SM U-164, and SM UB-88. Twelve United States Navy officers with 120 enlisted men were sent to England to sail the captured submarines of this expeditionary force across the Atlantic to be exhibited in the United States raising money for Liberty Bonds. UC-97 sailed from Harwich in April 1919 with U-111, U-164, and UB-88. The flotilla, escorted by USS Bushnell (AS-2), stopped in the Azores and Bermuda before reaching New York City. UC-97 sailed through the St. Lawrence River to the Great Lakes under the command of Charles A. Lockwood. LCDR Lockwood spent the summer of 1919 coordinating port calls with mayors of cities on lakes Ontario, Erie, Huron, and Michigan. By late August, the submarine's unfamiliar German machinery was no longer responding reliably to Lockwood's crew. The commandant of the 9th Naval District assumed control of UC-97 as Lockwood with his crew left to assume command of USS R-25 (SS-102) being built at Bridgeport, Connecticut. UC-97 was moored at the foot of Monroe Street and opened to tourists in Chicago's lakefront Grant Park.

== Destruction ==
A clause of the armistice treaty required all German combat vessels held by Allied forces to be destroyed before 1 July 1921. All armament, propulsion machinery, and navigation gear were removed from UC-97 before she was towed out into Lake Michigan by USS Hawk (IX-14) for use as a target during the annual summer training of naval reservists living in the Midwestern United States. USS Wilmette fired 18 rounds from a 4 in (10 cm) gun in 15 minutes to sink UC-97 20 nautical miles (37 km) off the coast of Highland Park, Illinois on 7 June 1921. The wreck of UC-97 has not been definitively located. It has been reported in a 2013 Toronto Star article that the U-boat was found in 1992 by the Chicago-based company A and T Recovery.
