= Roberts-Smith =

Roberts-Smith is a double-barrelled surname. It may refer to:

- Ben Roberts-Smith (born 1978), Australian former soldier
- Sam Roberts-Smith (born 1985), Australian opera singer
- Len Roberts-Smith (born 1946), Australian judge

== See also ==
- Robert Smith (disambiguation)
