= Robert L. Rasmussen =

American painter

Bob Rasmussen
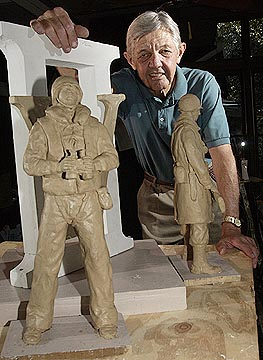
- Born: May 26, 1930 (age 96); Rio Vista, California
- Military career
- Allegiance: United States of America
- Branch: United States Navy
- Rank: Captain
- Commands: VF-111; USS Mount Hood (AE-29); Naval Station Roosevelt Roads, Puerto Rico; Naval Aviation Schools Command
- Conflicts: Korean War; Vietnam War
- Awards: Legion of Merit; Distinguished Flying Cross

Heroic size bronze statues surround Roman numeral II and "V" at the WWII Memorial in Pensacola, Florida, by R.L. Rasmussen.

Robert L. "Bob" Rasmussen (born May 26, 1930 in Rio Vista, California), is a noted military artist; a retired Captain of the United States Navy; a former career naval aviator, primarily in the F-8 Crusader; a former member of the U.S. Navy Flight Demonstration Squadron, the Blue Angels, and former Director of the National Naval Aviation Museum at NAS Pensacola, Florida.

== Naval career ==
Captain Rasmussen served on active duty from 20 October 1951 to 30 July 1983 and accumulated 5,000 total flight hours with 600 carrier/ship landings or “traps.”

Designated a Naval Aviator on 10 March 1953, his first fleet tour was with VF-51 Screaming Eagles at NAS Miramar flying Grumman F9F-2B Panther and North American FJ3 Fury aircraft from 1953-56.

After this tour he was selected as a Blue Angel. Initially flying the F9F-2B Panther, he participated in the introduction of the Grumman F11F Tiger in the Blue Angels Flight Demonstration Team in April 1957. While flying the Tiger with the Blues, he made the first successful “engine out” landing in an F-11. He remained with the Blues until 1960.

He returned to the fleet in 1960 at NAS Oceana with VF-33 then known as the Astronauts. In early 1961, he participated in another airframe transition (the squadron’s fourth jet fighter in seven years), the F8U-1E Crusader as the squadron changed its name back to Tarsiers. He deployed with VF-33 aboard USS Intrepid (CV-11) to the Mediterranean in 1961-62.

After staff assignments and US Naval Post Graduate School from 1962-1966, he returned to the F-8 community and Miramar at VF-124 Gunfighters, the F-8 fleet replacement squadron (FRS) as prospective Executive Officer (XO) for VF-111 Sundowners. He deployed in the June 1966 onboard the USS Oriskany in Carrier Air Group Sixteen (CVG-16) as the XO. During the cruise, he flew in combat in Operation Rolling Thunder flying on two to three times daily Alpha Strikes into the heart of North Vietnam His Vietnam war experiences, including surviving the fire aboard Oriskany, have been documented in several books. While accumulating over 200 combat missions on this deployment, he took command of VF-111 and brought it back to Miramar after the deployment.

Post command, he served as the aviation junior officer detailer at BUPERS from 1968-1970. In 1970, he reported to NAS Lemoore to qualify in the A-7 Corsair as the prospective commander of CVG-16. In 1971 he transferred to Carrier Division SEVEN at sea off Vietnam to serve as the chief of staff. In 1972, he reported to Concord, California, and took command of USS Mount Hood, a Kilauea-class ammunition ship which deployed again to the sea off Vietnam. In 1974 he became the commanding officer of NS Roosevelt Roads, Puerto Rico. He remained there until 1976, when he became director of aviation officer distribution at BUPERS.

In 1980, he returned to the starting place of his Naval Aviation career when he became the commanding officer of Naval Aviation Schools Command, Pensacola, Florida, a position he held until his retirement from active duty in 1983.

== Post Navy career ==
Due to his prowess as an artist, his knowledge of US Naval Aviation history, and his lengthy aviation career, he was asked to join the Naval Aviation Museum Foundation as vice president upon his retirement. In 1987, he fleeted up to director and oversaw the museum’s expansion in which its size and operation was increased 300% and collection was increased over 400%. He was inducted into the Naval Aviation Hall of Honor in 2008, and was awarded the Navy Superior Civilian Service Award on 24 September 2009. Captain Rasmussen retired as the Director of the museum on September 30, 2014. Rasmussen was inducted into the Florida Aviation Hall of Fame Class of 2024 during the May 2025 Sun-N-Fun Aerospace Expo.

== Art career ==
A prolific artist, Rasmussen has created hundreds of Naval Aviation paintings in watercolor, oil and acrylic. His bronze sculptures include the design of the Spirit of Naval Aviation, displayed at the front entrance of the National Museum of Naval Aviation, Pensacola, Florida, the Alan Shepard memorial heroic figure at the Astronaut Hall of Fame, and the World War II and Korean War memorials in Pensacola, Florida. His works have been displayed around the country, including the National Air and Space Museum in Washington, D.C., the National Naval Aviation Museum in Pensacola, Florida, and the NASA Museum at Cape Canaveral, Florida. Rasmussen is the recipient of the R.G. Smith Award for Excellence in Naval Aviation Art,

== Personal life ==
Captain Rasmussen is married to the former Phyllis Colter of Pensacola. They have two children, daughter Kathryn and son Eric; Eric is also a retired Navy Captain, Naval Aviator and career F/A-18 Hornet pilot.
