= Robert Smith (journalist, born 1940) =

American journalist, author, lawyer

Robert Michael Smith (born November 4, 1940) is an American mediator, lawyer, author, and former journalist for The New York Times.

Smith covered Washington for The New York Times in the 1960s and 1970s. The New York Times, BBC News, NBC, and other media outlets featured articles about how Smith had the scoop on Watergate two months before journalists Bob Woodward and Carl Bernstein broke the story for The Washington Post. The scandal led to the resignation of President Richard Nixon.

In his memoir, Suppressed: Confessions of a New York Times Washington Correspondent, Smith criticizes the Times for its failure to use the Watergate information and its subsequent lack of neutrality in covering Washington. The book recounts Smith's lunch with the then acting director of the FBI, L. Patrick Gray, who gave Smith detailed information about Watergate.

== Early life, education, military service ==
Smith grew up in Boston. He earned a BA at Harvard College, and was a Fulbright Scholar at the University of Tübingen, Germany. He graduated from Columbia University with an MA in International Affairs and an MS in journalism. He served as a First Lieutenant and Infantry platoon leader in the US Army Reserve from 1965 through 1971. In 1972, Smith left the Times to attend Yale Law School.

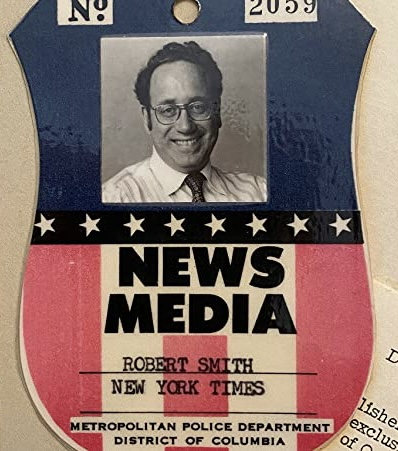
Robert Smith's New York Times press badge.

== Journalism career, scoop on Watergate ==
Smith began his full-time journalism career in 1965 as a correspondent for Time magazine. He became a rewrite man at The New York Times before becoming a correspondent in the Washington Bureau.

While working at the Times, notable events Smith covered, in addition to Watergate, include the My Lai massacre, the shooting of students at Kent State University, and the cutting of liaison between the CIA and the FBI.

Despite the risk of prosecution, Smith signed an affidavit in support of the Times in the Pentagon Papers case in federal court. The affidavit said Smith regularly received classified information from United States government sources.

In the Watergate context, on his last day at the Times before leaving for Yale, Smith had lunch with the Acting FBI Director, L. Patrick Gray. Gray disclosed to Smith that John N. Mitchell, the former US Attorney General, was involved in the break-in at the Democratic National Committee Headquarters at the Watergate Office Building. Gray suggested that the White House was also involved.

Smith gave the story to the News Editor of the Times Washington Bureau, Robert Phelps. Smith recorded his briefing of Phelps and gave Phelps the tape for his use, but the story never appeared. In his memoir, Phelps admitted that he had failed to assign the story to another reporter and said he was unable to explain why he had, in fact, done nothing at all with Smith's information.

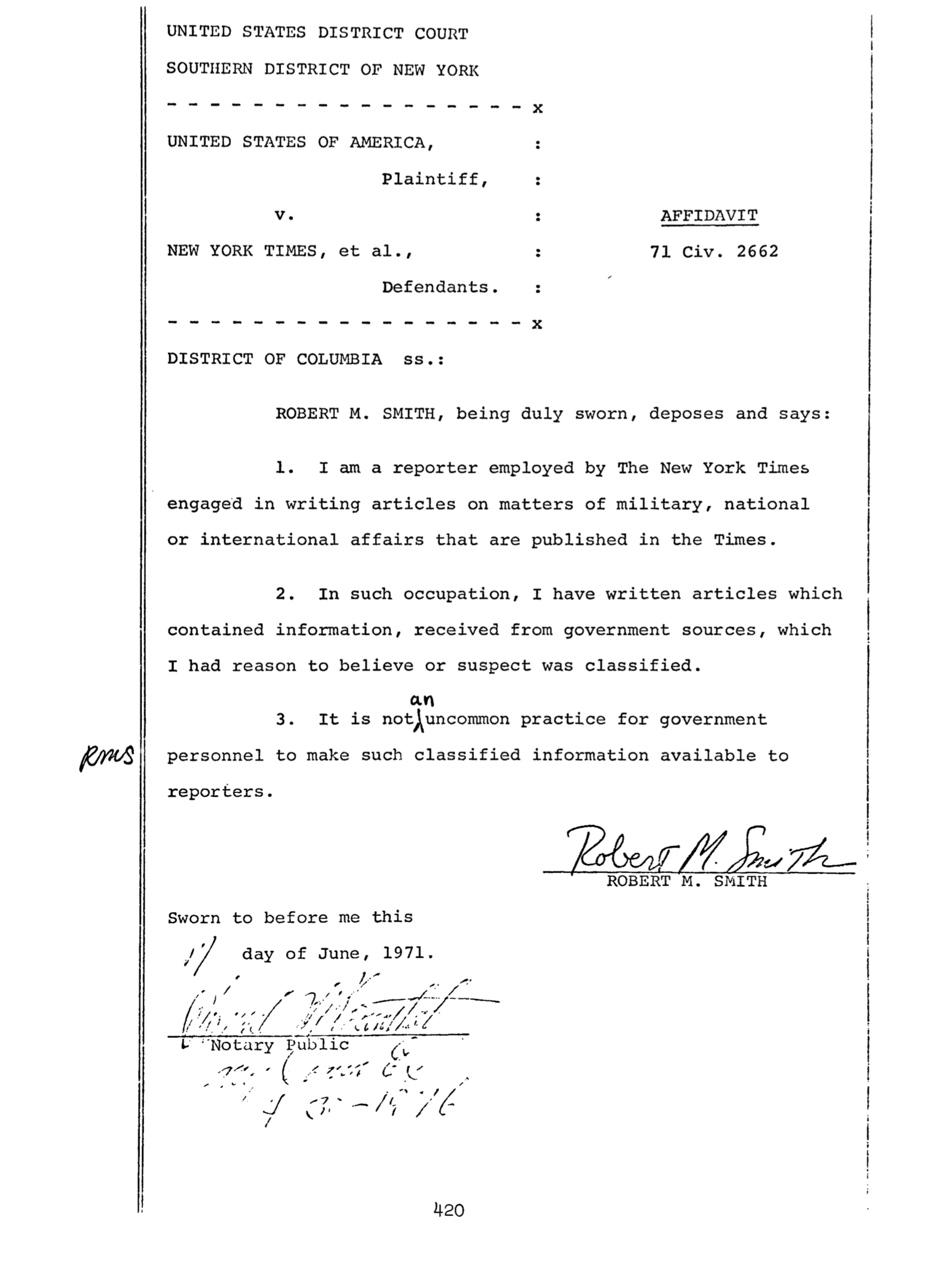
Affidavit signed by Robert Smith in the Pentagon Papers Case. Source: The New York Times Company v. United States: a documentary history.

“For a short time, we had our own leak in the FBI, but my dereliction, and long-laid plans by Robert M. Smith, our Justice Department reporter, to attend law school held us back from printing anything,” Phelps wrote in his memoir. “…I should have circulated Smith’s debriefing to all our Watergate reporters. It would have never been lost with all those ears hearing it.”

== Legal and mediation careers ==
After leaving the Times, Smith worked as an attorney with Heller, Ehrman, White, & McAuliffe in San Francisco from 1976 to 1978. He returned to Washington to serve as Special Assistant to Attorney General Benjamin R. Civiletti under President Jimmy Carter. He was Chief Spokesperson for the US Department of Justice.

Smith was a member of the US Delegation to the International Court of Justice in The Hague in US vs. Iran, the case in which the United States sought to obtain the release of American hostages seized by Iran. Smith was given the responsibility of rewriting the final version of the brief the United States presented to the World Court.

After his service in the Carter Administration, Smith returned to San Francisco, where he managed overseas litigation for the Bank of America and started his own practice as a trial lawyer.

In 2002, Smith became a barrister of the Inner Temple in London. He served as Director of Mediation at the Centre for Effective Dispute Resolution. He taught a seminar on mediation theory and practice at the Faculty of Law at the University of Oxford. Smith currently lives in San Francisco, where he continues to mediate domestic and international disputes, and continues his writing.

== Books ==
● Alternative Dispute Resolution for Financial Institutions, West Group, 1995.

● Suppressed: Confessions of a New York Times Washington Correspondent, Rowman & Littlefield, 2021
