= National Naval Aviation Museum =

Military and aerospace museum in Pensacola, FL, USA

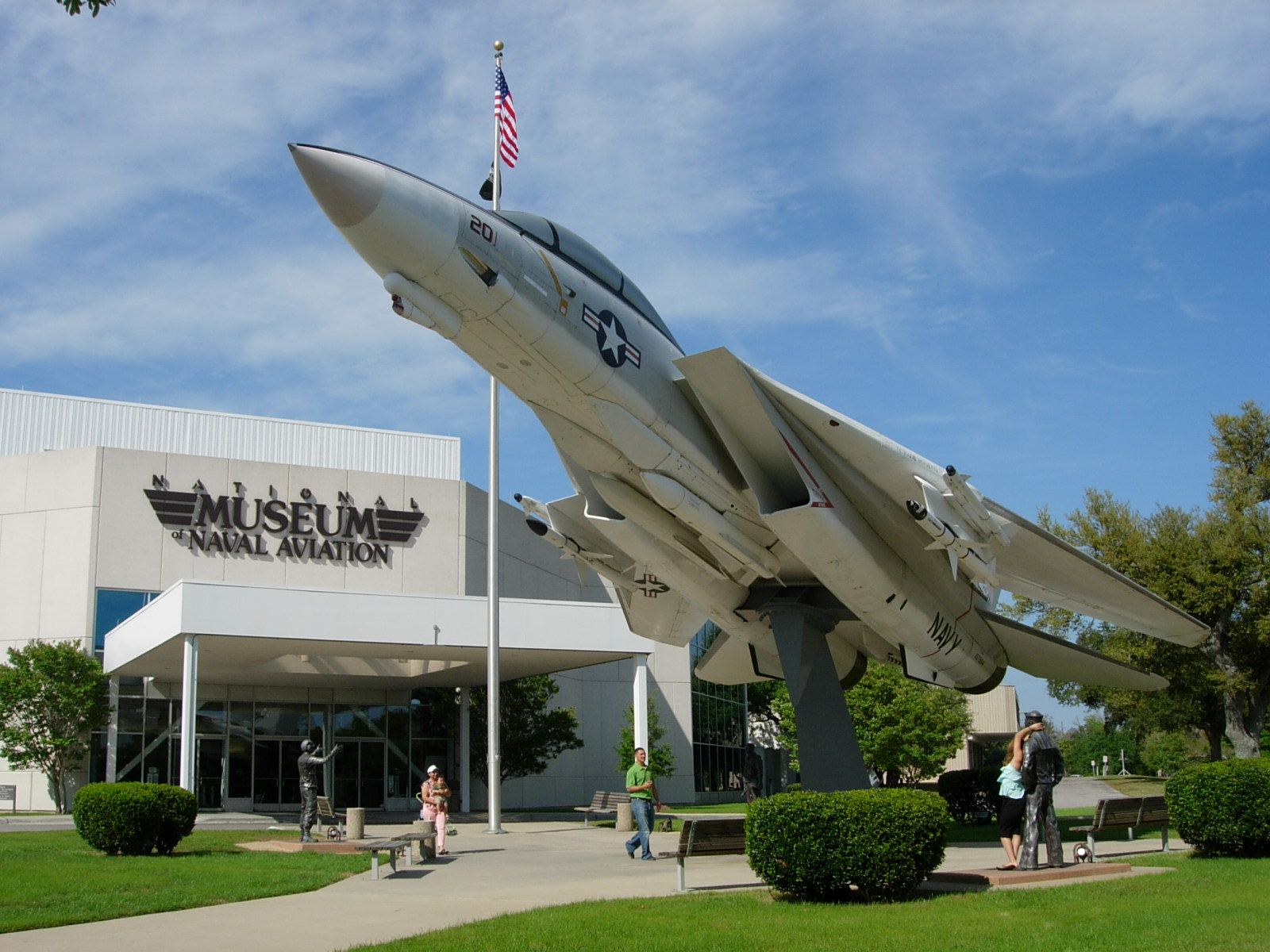
- Grumman F-14A Tomcat in front of the museum

- Location within Florida
- Former name: National Museum of Naval Aviation and Naval Aviation Museum
- Established: 1962
- Location: Pensacola, Florida, US
- Coordinates: 30.349580°N 87.303582°W
- Type: U.S. Navy
- Founder: Rear Admiral Magruder H. Tuttle
- Directors: Captain Sterling Gilliam, Jr.
- Website: www.navalaviationmuseum.org

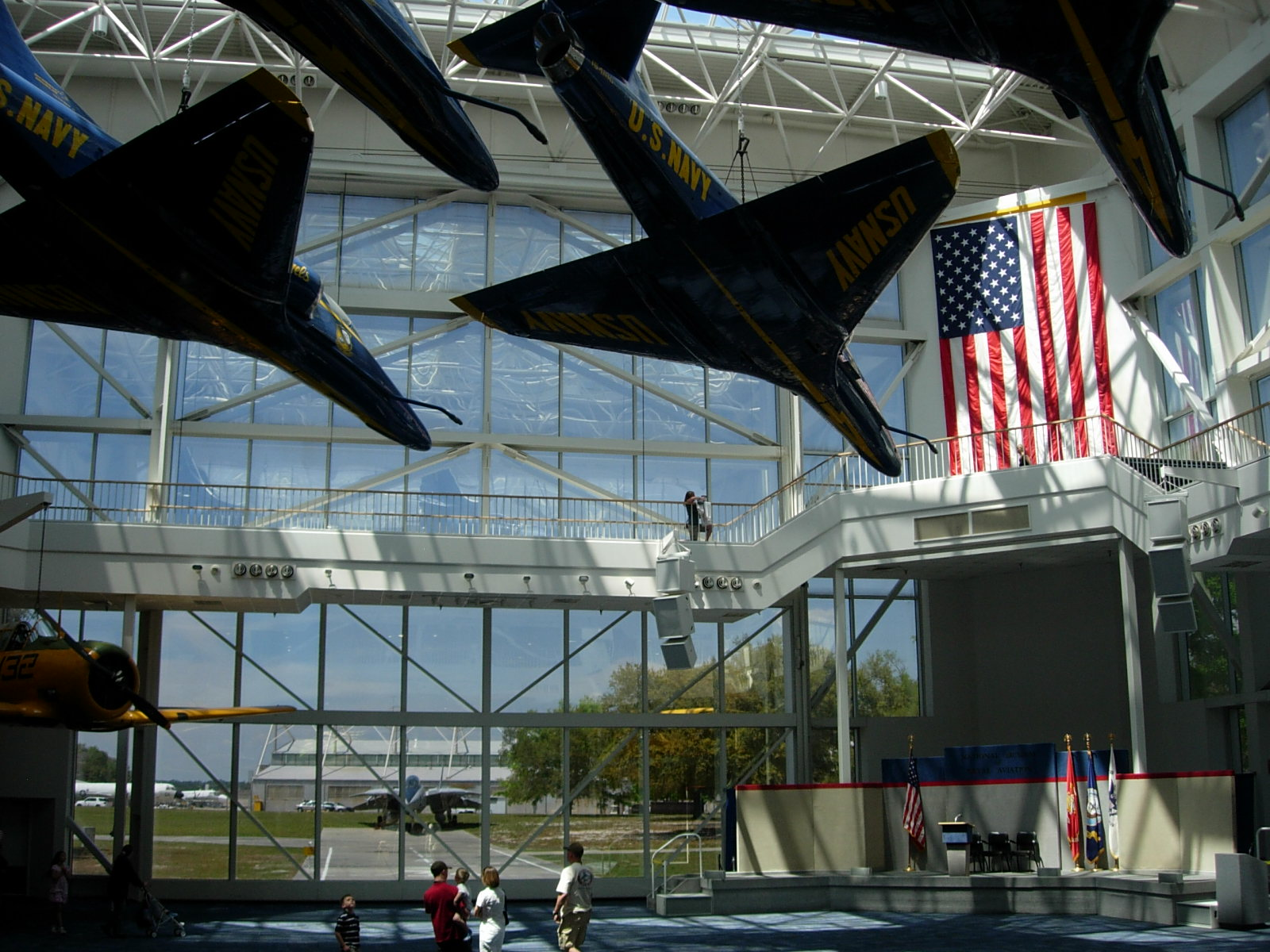
The Blue Angels Atrium in the National Naval Aviation Museum

The National Naval Aviation Museum, formerly known as the National Museum of Naval Aviation and the Naval Aviation Museum, is a military and aerospace museum located at Naval Air Station Pensacola, Florida, US.

Founded in 1962 and moved to its current location in 1974, the museum has now been reopened to the public starting May 2023, after a temporary close in 2019.

== Overview ==
The museum is devoted to the history of naval aviation, including that of the United States Navy, the United States Marine Corps, and the United States Coast Guard. Its mission is "to select, collect, preserve and display" appropriate memorabilia representative of the development, growth and historic heritage of United States Naval Aviation. More than 150 aircraft and spacecraft are on display, including four former Blue Angels A-4 Skyhawks, the Curtiss NC-4 (the first aircraft to cross the Atlantic), U.S. Coast Guard helicopters, biplanes, the control gondola and tail fin of the K-class blimp K-47, an aircraft that President George H. W. Bush trained in, and the S-3 Viking used to transport President George W. Bush to the USS Abraham Lincoln in 2003 (see Navy One). These historic and one-of-a-kind aircraft are displayed inside the museum's 300,000 square feet (30,000 m^{2}) of exhibit space and outside on its 37-acre (150,000 m^{2}) grounds.

The museum also functions in coordination with the Naval Air Systems Command (NAVAIRSYSCOM or NAVAIR) as the Navy's program manager for nearly all other retired Navy, Marine Corps and Coast Guard aircraft on display aboard U.S. military installations in the United States or overseas, or in numerous other museums or public displays. In a similar manner to U.S. Air Force aircraft on loan from the NMUSAF's collection that remain under official USAF ownership, these other American-preserved naval aircraft remain the property of the Department of the Navy and are typically identified at these locations as being "On Loan from the National Naval Aviation Museum."

The museum has a Giant Screen Theater, flight simulators, Blue Angels 4D Experience, museum store, and cafe. The Cubi Point Café displays squadron memorabilia from the closed NAS Cubi Point Officers' Club.

=== Emil Buehler Naval Aviation Library ===
The museum houses the Emil Buehler Naval Aviation Library. Established in 1992 with funding from the Emil Buehler Trust, it serves as a non-circulating repository for the National Naval Aviation Museum and is considered one of the richest sources of Naval history in the United States. The library's namesake, Emil Buehler, was an aviation pioneer who funded a philanthropic trust and education programs in colleges throughout Florida and the eastern United States. The library holds artifacts and special collections of items from people and events of importance to the history of aviation in America and naval history. The collection contains books, oral histories, pictures, manuscripts, technical manuals and about 400,000 photographs, many of which are searchable and organized. The library's special collections include a sampling of the earliest tales gathered by members of the Brown Shoe Project, who have compiled stories and histories of aviation squadrons that flew missions during the Korean War. It hosts commemorations such as the 50th anniversary of the Apollo 11 Moon landing in 2019. The library holds Buzz Aldrin’s flight training records from the early days of his Naval career.

=== National Flight Academy ===
Adjacent to the museum and library is the National Flight Academy, a four-story simulated aircraft carrier housing over 30 networked flight simulators. Throughout the summer, more than 200 students per week (7th through 12th grade) from across the nation attend the National Flight Academy's 6-day program, designed to inspire attendees to pursue a future in STEM (science, technology, engineering and mathematics).

The museum is supported by a 501(c)(3) educational non-profit organization, the Naval Aviation Museum Foundation. Since 1966, this foundation has raised tens of millions of dollars to construct the museum, build exhibits, recover and restore aircraft, and develop educational programs like the National Flight Academy.

Practice demonstrations by the United States Navy Flight Demonstration Squadron, the Blue Angels, may be viewed from the museum most Tuesday and Wednesday mornings between March and November. These practices are weather permitting, and a tentative practice schedule may be viewed on the Blue Angels' website.

Captain Robert L. Rasmussen, a retired Navy captain, former Navy fighter pilot and former Blue Angels demonstration pilot, served as museum director for 27 years and reported to the Naval History & Heritage Command. Also an artist, some of his works are displayed in the museum. Captain Rasmussen retired as director in 2014 and was replaced by Captain Sterling Gilliam, Jr.

== History ==
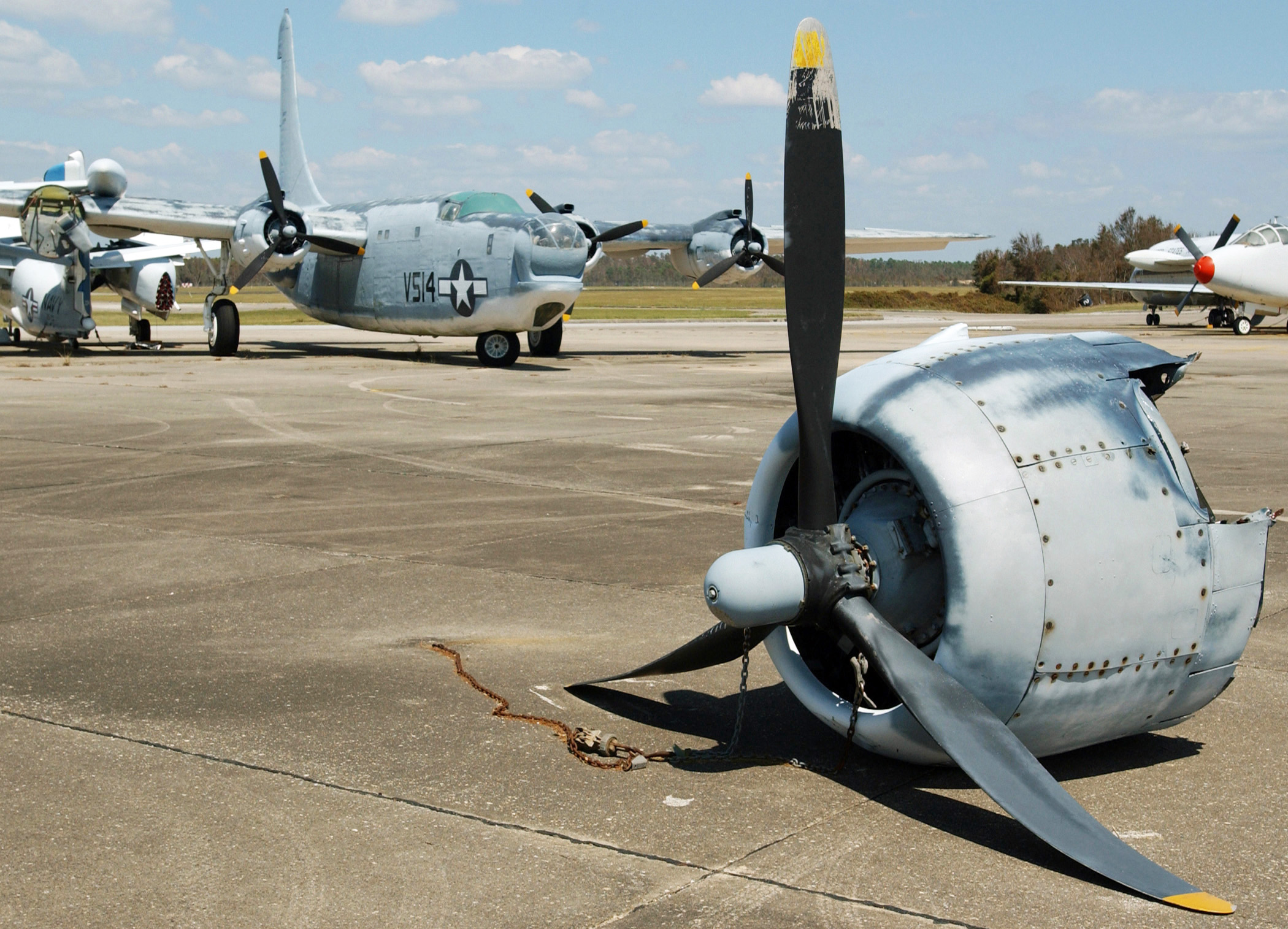
Damage to the museum's PB4Y after Hurricane Ivan

The museum was established 14 December 1962 in a cramped 8,500 square feet (790 m^{2}) building erected during World War II. It was dedicated in June 1963.

Construction of the current facility began in November 1972. The Phase I portion opened in November 1974 and was dedicated on 13 April 1975 . The Phase II portion was completed in 1980, and the Phase III portion in 1990. In the meantime, it had been renamed the National Museum of Naval Aviation in May 1989.

The museum and some of its aircraft on display outside were damaged by Hurricane Ivan in September 2004.

In 2019, after a gunman killed three people and injured eight more at the air station, the museum and other National Park attractions were closed to the public.

In 2020, the museum was closed for seven months during the COVID-19 pandemic.

In 2021, museum officials were reported to be planning to reopen the museum to the public.

In 2022, discussions began on converting portions of existing roads to create a dedicated access corridor to the museum.

On 3 May 2023, the museum announced that it would once again be open to the general public after three and a half years on 17 May 2023. Visitors must provide a valid state-issued I.D.

The museum opened a new exhibit about naval aerospace medicine in October 2024.

Starting around 2024, the museum began transferring a number of aircraft to other museums, including an NU-1B sent to the Hickory Aviation Museum, a C-46 sent to the Air Mobility Command Museum, a PBY loaned to the Air Zoo for restoration and an F6U loaned to the Fort Worth Aviation Museum.

The museum opened a new exhibit about HA(L)-3 in September 2026.

== Collection ==
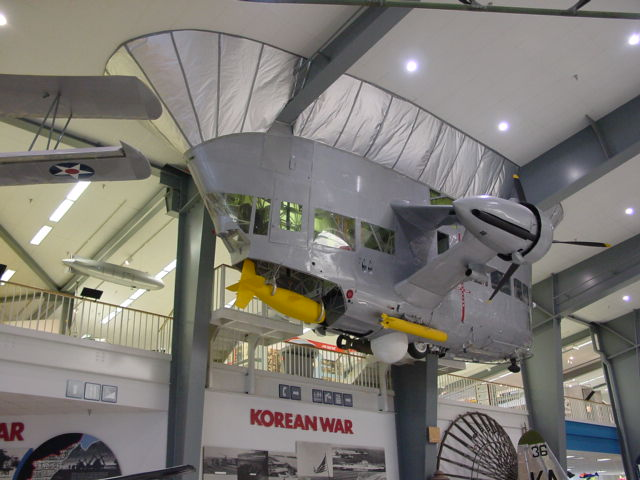
Control car of a K class blimp in the museum

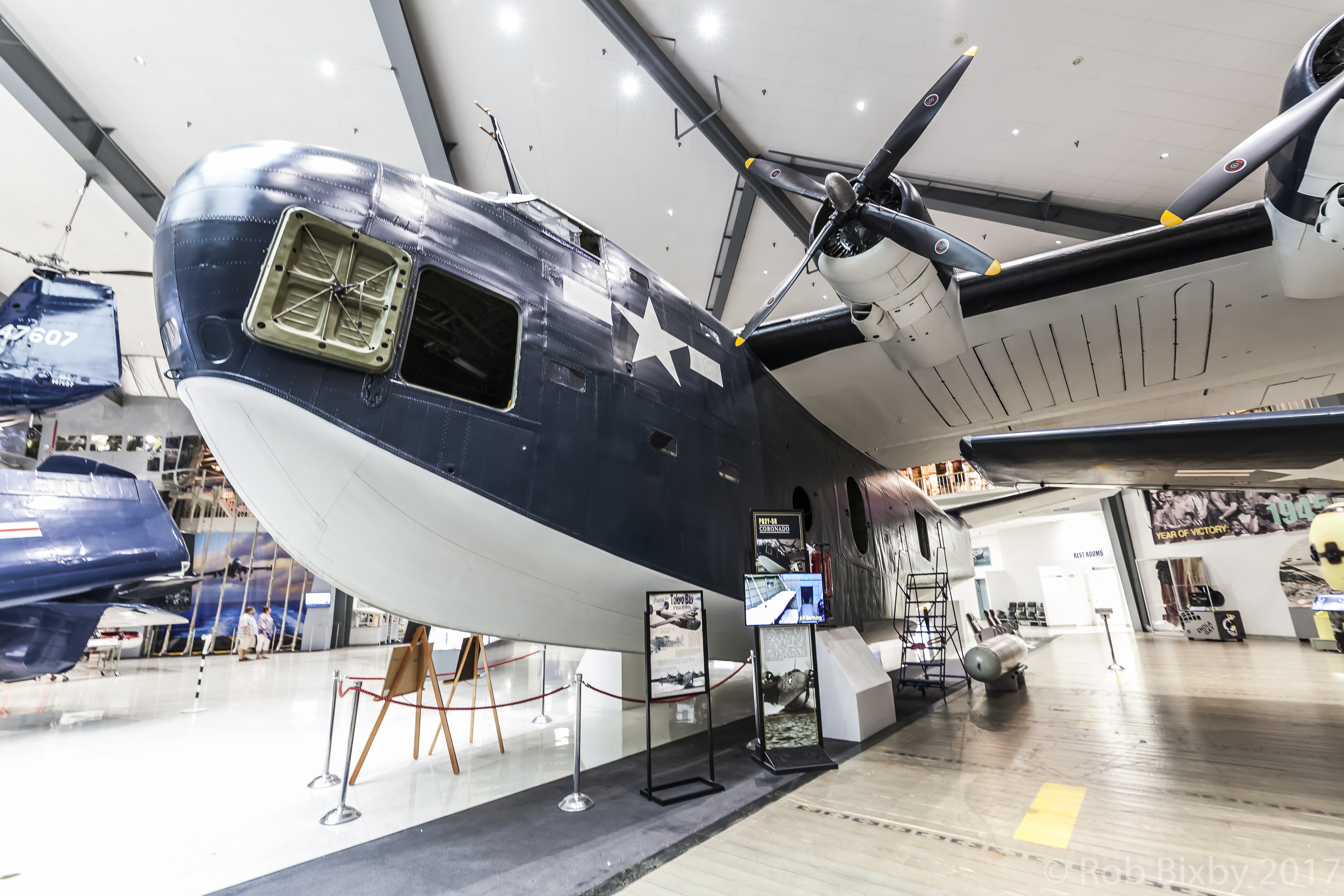
Consolidated PB2Y Coronado; this seaplane delivered Adm. Nimitz to Tokyo for the signing of the Japanese surrender

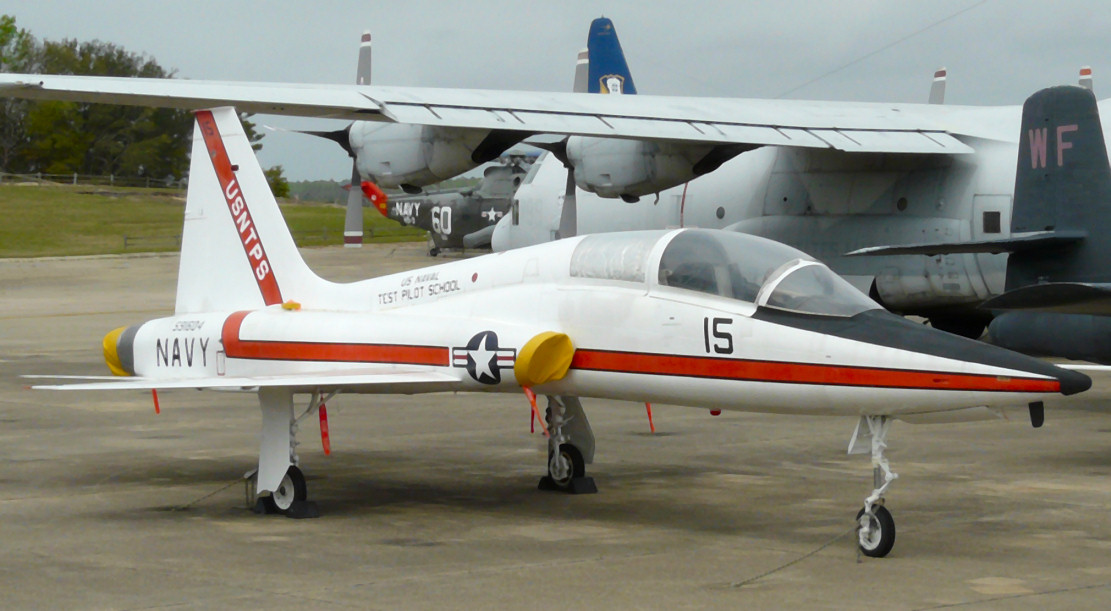
Northrop T-38 Talon at the museum

=== Airplanes ===
- Beechcraft GB-2 Traveler – USN BuNo 23688
- Beechcraft SNB-5P Expeditor
- Beechcraft T-34B Mentor – USN BuNo 161842
- Beechcraft T-34C Turbo-Mentor – USN BuNo 161842
- Boeing P-12F – USAAC s/n 32-92 (displayed as F4B-4)
- Brewster Bermuda Mk.1 – RAF s/n FF860 (displayed as SB2A Buccaneer)
- Cessna UC-78B Bobcat – USAAF s/n 43-7995 (displayed as JRC-1 Bobcat BuNo 63426)
- Cessna O-1G Bird Dog – RVNAF s/n 5L-14981
- Consolidated N2Y-1 – USN BuNo A8605
- Consolidated PBY-5 Catalina – USN BuNo 08317 (suspended)
- Consolidated Catalina Mk.IB – RAF s/n FP216 (cutaway)
- Consolidated PBY Catalina (flight line)
- Consolidated PB2Y-5R Coronado – USN BuNo 7099
- Consolidated PB4Y-2 Privateer
- Convair C-131 Samaritan
- Curtiss A-1 Triad (replica)
- Curtiss BFC-2 Goshawk – USN BuNo 9332
- Curtiss P-1 Hawk – c/n 60 (displayed as F6C-1 BuNo A6969)
- Curtiss F7C-1 Seahawk – USMC BuNo A7667
- Curtiss JN-4D Jenny – USN BuNo A995
- Naval Aircraft Factory Model MF – USN BuNo A5483
- Curtiss NC-4 – USN BuNo A2294
- Curtiss N2C-2 Fledgling – USN BuNo A8529
- Curtiss Tomahawk Mk.IIB – VVS s/n 7 (displayed in Flying Tigers markings)
- Curtiss-Wright R5C Commando
- Curtiss-Wright SNC-1 Falcon – USN BuNo 05194
- de Havilland Canada NU-1B Otter
- Douglas EA-1F Skyraider – USN BuNo 135300
- Douglas A-1H Skyraider – USN BuNo 135300
- Douglas NA-3A Skywarrior – USN BuNo 135418
- Douglas A-4A Skyhawk
- Douglas A-4E Skyhawk
- Douglas A-4E/F Skyhawk (four in Blue Angels markings)
- Douglas R4D-5L Skytrain
- Douglas C-117D (R4D-8) Skytrain
- Douglas R6D/C-118 Liftmaster
- Douglas RD-4 Dolphin
- Douglas F3D Skyknight
- Douglas F4D-1 Skyray
- Douglas D-558-1 Skystreak
- Douglas JD Invader
- Douglas SBD-2 Dauntless (Midway veteran)
- Douglas SBD Dauntless (underwater display)
- Fokker D.VII
- Ford RR-5 Trimotor
- General Dynamics F-16N Viper
- General Motors FM-2 Wildcat (quarterdeck)
- General Motors FM-2 Wildcat (Pacific island)
- General Motors TBM-3E Avenger
- Goodyear FG-1D Corsair
- Grumman A-6E Intruder
- Grumman AF Guardian
- Grumman C-1 Trader
- Grumman E-1 Tracer
- Grumman E-2C Hawkeye
- Grumman G-23 (restored as FF-1)
- Grumman F3F-2
- Grumman F4F Wildcat (underwater display)
- Grumman F4F-3 Wildcat
- Grumman F4F-3A Wildcat
- Grumman F6F-3 Hellcat
- Grumman F6F-5 Hellcat
- Grumman F7F Tigercat
- Grumman F8F Bearcat
- Grumman F9F-2 Panther
- Grumman F9F-6 Cougar
- Grumman F9F-8 Cougar
- Grumman F11F-1 Tiger
- Grumman YF-14A Tomcat (Pedestal outside)
- Grumman F-14D(R) Tomcat
- Grumman HU-16 Albatross
- Grumman J2F Duck
- Grumman J4F Widgeon
- Grumman JRF Goose
- Grumman S2F Tracker
- Grumman TC-4C Academe
- Hanriot HD.1
- Hawker Siddeley AV-8C Harrier
- Interstate TDR
- Kawanishi N1K2 Shiden
- Lockheed C-130T Hercules (Fat Albert)
- Lockheed EC-121 Warning Star
- Lockheed KC-130F Hercules
- Lockheed L-10 Electra
- Lockheed PV-2 Harpoon
- Lockheed P2V-1 Neptune (Truculent Turtle)
- Lockheed P2V-7/SP-2H Neptune
- Lockheed P-3A Orion
- Lockheed S-3B Viking (ex-Navy One)
- Lockheed TV-2
- Martin AM Mauler
- Martin SP-5B Marlin
- McDonnell FH-1 Phantom
- McDonnell F2H-2P Banshee
- McDonnell F2H-4 Banshee
- McDonnell F3H-2M Demon
- McDonnell Douglas C-9 Skytrain II
- McDonnell-Douglas F-4N Phantom II
- McDonnell Douglas F/A-18A Hornet (Blue Angels)
- McDonnell Douglas F/A-18C Hornet
- McDonnell-Douglas RF-4B Phantom II
- Messerschmitt Me 262
- Mikoyan-Gurevich MiG-15
- Mikoyan-Gurevich MiG-21
- Mitsubishi A6M Zero
- Naval Aircraft Factory N3N-3 Canary (wheels)
- Naval Aircraft Factory N3N-3 Canary (floats)
- New Standard NT-1
- Nieuport 28 C.1
- North American AJ Savage
- North American FJ-2 Fury
- North American FJ-4 Fury
- North American B-25J Mitchell
- North American RA-5C Vigilante
- North American SNJ-5C Texan
- North American SNJ Texan (Cutaway)
- North American T-2 Buckeye
- North American T-28 Trojan
- North American T-39 Sabreliner
- Northrop T-38A Talon
- Ryan NR-1 Recruit
- Schweizer LNS-1
- Sopwith F.1 Camel
- Stearman N2S-3 Kaydet
- Temco TT-1 Pinto
- Thomas-Morse S-4C Scout
- Timm N2T Tutor
- Vought A-7E Corsair II
- Vought F4U-1 Corsair
- Vought F4U-4 Corsair (replica)
- Vought F6U Pirate
- Vought F7U-3M Cutlass
- Vought F-8A Crusader
- Vought OS2U Kingfisher
- Vought SB2U-2 Vindicator
- Vultee SNV Valiant

=== Gliders ===
- Franklin PS-2

=== Helicopters ===
- Bell AH-1W SuperCobra
- Bell HTL-4 Sioux
- Bell HTL Sioux
- Bell HH-1K Iroquois
- Bell TH-57 Sea Ranger
- Boeing CH-46D Sea Knight
- Hiller HTE
- Kaman SH-2F Seasprite
- Piasecki HUP Retriever
- Sikorsky VH-3A Sea King
- Sikorsky HH-3F Pelican
- Sikorsky CH-37 Mojave
- Sikorsky HH-52A Sea Guard
- Sikorsky CH-53D Sea Stallion
- Sikorsky SH-60B Seahawk
- Sikorsky HNS Hoverfly
- Sikorsky HO3S-1G
- Sikorsky HO5S
- Sikorsky HSS/HUS Seabat/Seahorse

=== Airships ===
- Goodyear K-47 control car
- Goodyear L-8 control car
- Goodyear ZPG-2 control car

=== Spacecraft ===
- Apollo Command Module (Skylab 2)
- Apollo Lunar Module (replica)

== See also ==
- Naval Aviation Hall of Honor
- List of maritime museums in the United States

=== Naval aviation museums ===
- Aeronauticum, German naval aviation museum, Nordholz
- Fleet Air Arm Museum, United Kingdom museum of naval aviation, Yeovil, Somerset
- Fleet Air Arm Museum (Australia), Australian museum of naval aviation, Nowra, New South Wales
- Naval Aviation Museum (India), Indian naval aviation museum, Goa, India
- Shearwater Aviation Museum, Canadian naval aviation museum, Sheerwater, Nova Scotia.
- Pacific Aviation Museum, US Pacific Fleet and Japanese aviation, Pearl Harbor, Hawaii.

=== United States museums ===
- Flying Leatherneck Aviation Museum
- List of maritime museums in the United States
- U.S. Navy Museum
- National Museum of the United States Air Force
- United States Army Aviation Museum

=== Other ===
- A and T Recovery
- R.G. Smith Award
- List of aerospace museums
