= Rob Smith (footballer, born 1950) =

English footballer

Personal information
- Full name: Robert Smith
- Date of birth: 25 April 1950 (age 76)
- Place of birth: Kingston upon Hull, England
- Position: Full-back

Senior career*
Years	Team	Apps	(Gls)
1967–1971	Hull City	0	(0)
1971–1972	Grimsby Town	11	(0)
1972–1976	Hartlepool	152	(4)
1976–1979	Scarborough		
1979–19??	Bridlington Trinity		
- * Club domestic league appearances and goals

Robert "Rob" Smith (born 25 April 1950) is an English former professional footballer who played as a full-back.
