= Robert Smith (Darwen footballer) =

English footballer

Personal information
- Position: Forward

Senior career*
| Years | Team | Apps | (Gls) |
| 1891–1894 | Darwen | 36 | (7) |
- * Club domestic league appearances and goals

Robert Smith was an English footballer who played in the Football League for Darwen.
