= Robert Smith (Australian cricketer) =

Australian cricketer

Personal information
- Born: 27 May 1868; Harrow, Victoria, Australia
- Died: 21 August 1927 (aged 59); Melbourne, Australia

Domestic team information
- Years: Team
- 1890: Victoria
- Source: Cricinfo, 25 July 2015

Robert Smith (27 May 1868 – 21 August 1927) was an Australian cricketer. He played one first-class cricket match for Victoria in 1890.

== See also ==
- List of Victoria first-class cricketers
