= Robert MacKay Smith =

Scottish businessman and meteorologist (1802–1888)

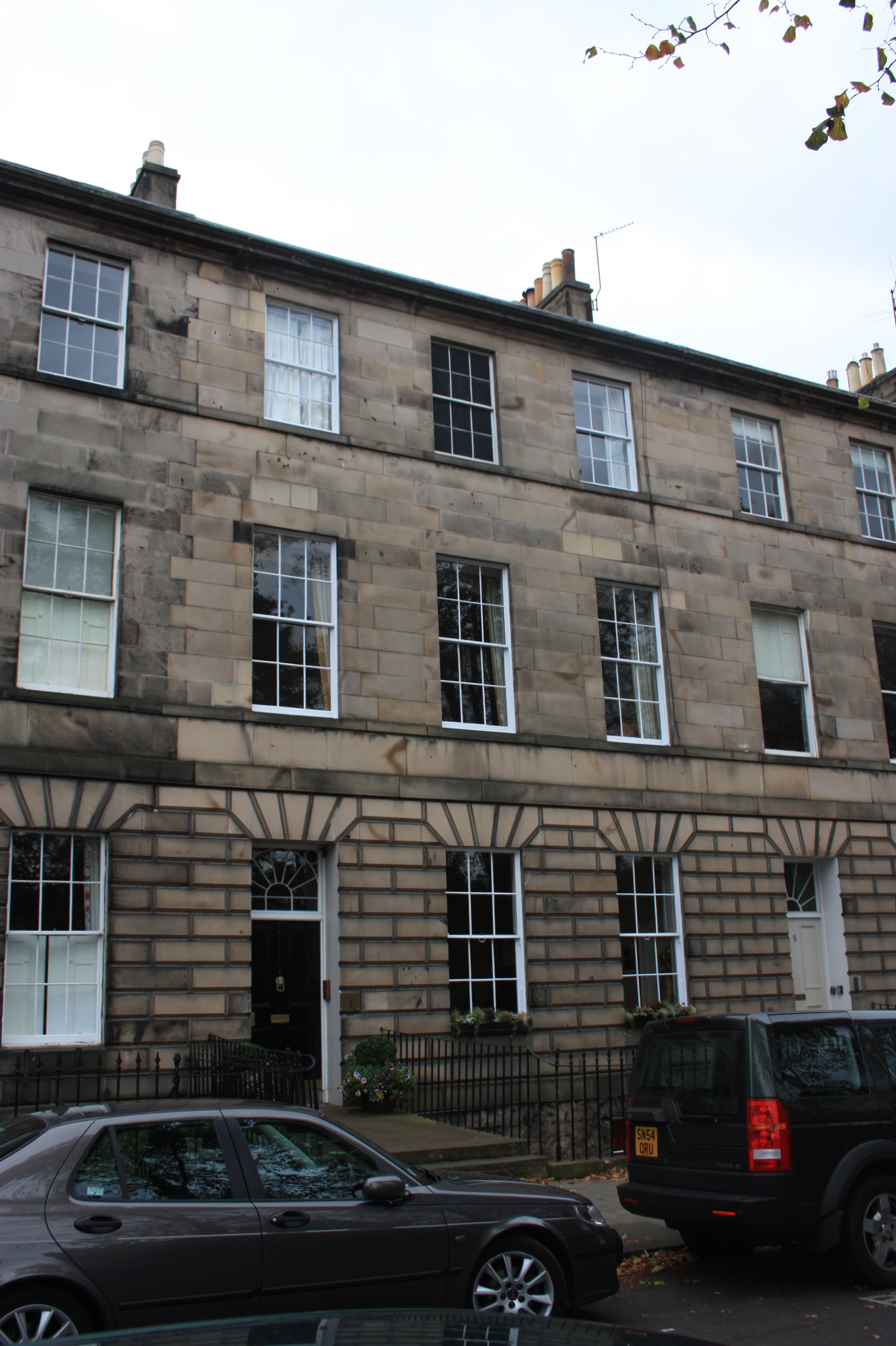
4 Bellevue Crescent, Edinburgh

Robert Mackay Smith FRSE (1802–1888) was a Scottish businessman, meteorologist and philanthropist. Glasgow University's Mackay Smith Prizes were founded by him in 1882. He was the Chairman of the Edinburgh Chamber of Commerce and a Director of the Commercial Bank of Scotland.

== Life ==
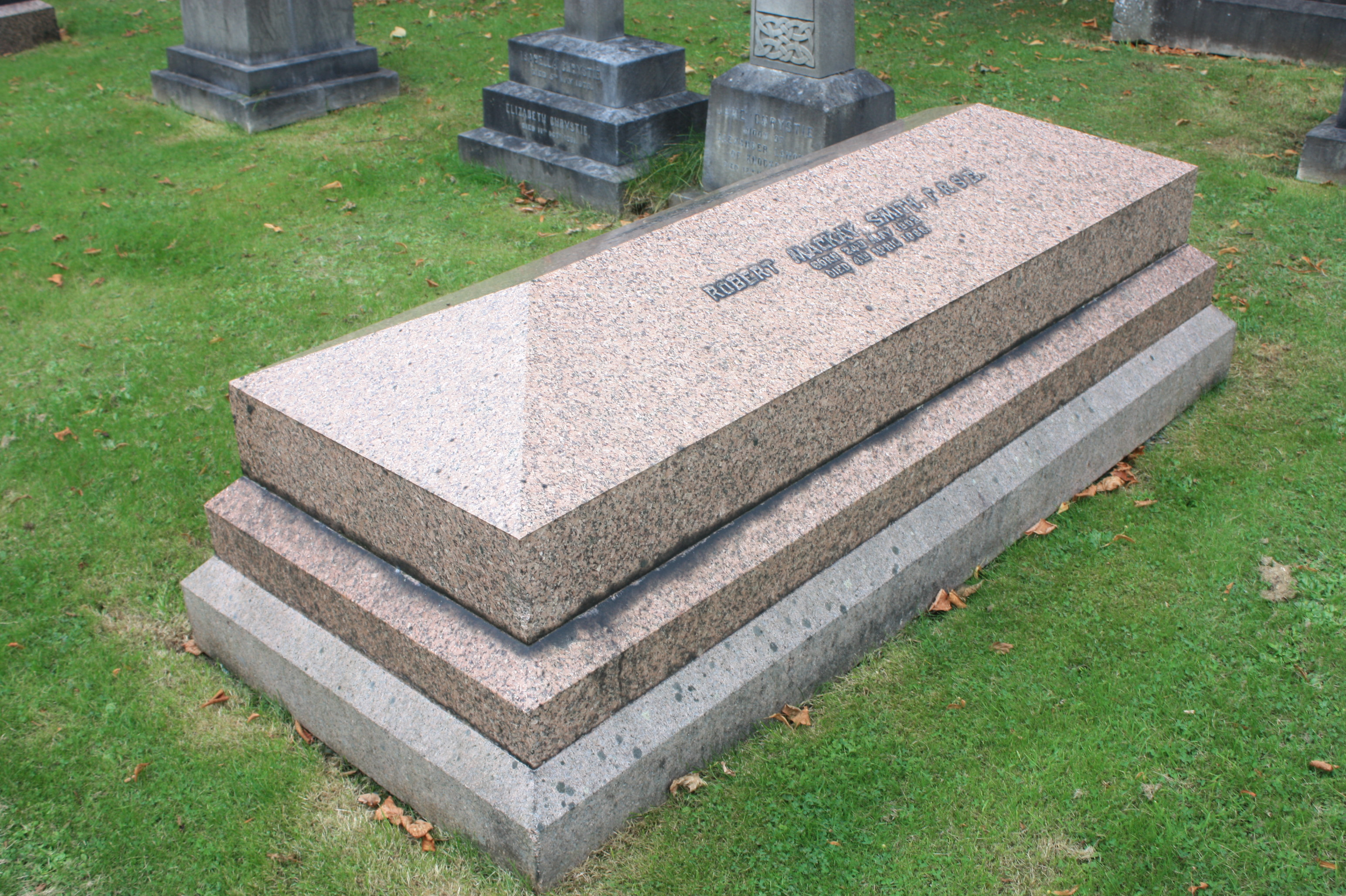
The grave of Robert MacKay Smith, Dean Cemetery, Edinburgh

He was born in Glasgow on 24 May 1802 the son of Peter Smith, a flax merchant living at 76 Stirling Street and his wife, Euphemia MacKay. He attended Glasgow University studying Sciences and graduated MA in 1815, aged only thirteen.

He moved to Leith in 1834 to work as a commission agent and lived and worked there for most of his life. He originally lived at 4 Windsor Street near the top of Leith Walk.

In 1855 he was elected a Fellow of the Royal Society of Edinburgh his proposer being Charles Piazzi Smyth. He was a member of multiple scientific societies including the Meteorological Society of Scotland, the Society of Antiquaries of Scotland, the Royal Scottish Society of Arts (serving as their president) and the Edinburgh Philosophical Society (Director 1851).

He died on 4 April 1888 at his home, 4 Bellevue Crescent in Edinburgh He is buried in one of the small south sections in Dean Cemetery in the west side of the city.

He never married and had no children.
