= Wordsmith (TV series) =

Wordsmith is a thirty-part instructional television series about the English language. It is meant to help students expand their vocabulary through analyzing the parts of English words. It is meant for classroom use, either through direct broadcast or through videotapes recorded from the airings by teachers or other school district personnel. The host is Bob Kupa'a Smith. In 2020, archived episodes were posted for public viewing on Indiana University's Libraries Moving Image Archive.

== Production ==
Two series of Wordsmith were made. The first, in black and white, was filmed at KQED studios in San Francisco in 1964-1965, and was originally aimed at fifth grade elementary school students. Joanne Mock was the producer/director. It was distributed by the National Center for School and College Television (now called the Agency for Instructional Technology, or AIT). The show was largely improvised by host Bob Smith.

Ten years later in 1975, the series was remade in color for AIT, then known as the Agency for Instructional Television. The executive producer was Gordon Hughan. The producer-directors were Glenn Johnson and Karen Hamamura Nelson. Its target audience ranged from middle school to high school students. It was recorded at the studios of KLCS, the station of the Los Angeles Unified School District. This second series is the one generally viewed today.

The show was hosted by Robert W. L. Smith, a University of Michigan linguistics doctoral student. Episodes, which had a 20-minute runtime, were directed to students in fifth and sixth grade. In American schools, the series was widely adopted.

== Format ==
Each 15-minute episode focuses on a related group of word cells, most of which derive from the ancient Greek and Latin languages. "Word Cell" is a term invented by series host Bob Smith as a more user-friendly alternative to terms like "prefix," suffix" and "root word," all three of which are included in the concept "Word Cell." Bob wore the large-frame glasses and striking clothes of the era.

Each program consists of a series of scenes, some taking place in the studio, and some filmed elsewhere. There are a variety of characters that act out or comment on the words featured in the episode. There are several recurring characters, portrayed not by actors but by framed portrait drawings, including Mr. Homonym, who knows what he means, but not which spelling to use, and Ms. Onomatopoeia, Ms. Hyperbole, and Mr. Alliteration.

The word cells appear in the form of circular plastic-foam balls. When cracked open, they reveal the meaning inside. Once displayed, they get tossed down a clear plastic tube, to the accompaniment of a slide whistle sound, to reach an unknown end.

There are "superwords," extra long words that have to do with some of the word cells in the episode.

Sometimes, children appear on the episode to tell people what their name means. This is called "What's in a Name."

There are also tests that go with the given vocabulary to reinforce memory.

== Episode content ==
The episodes can be viewed in any order. The following list only includes the highlights and main word cells of each episode:

1. Sound Stereo, Audi, Son, Stentor, Decibel, Phon, tintinnabulation

2. Body I Manu, Dent, Capit, Pod, Ped, Derm, Opt, Hand, Sesqui, sinister, dextr, gauche

3. Body II Ocul, Cap, Corp, Derm, Opt (Ophth), Head, Dent, Cyclops

4. Fire Ign, Torr, Pyr, Therm, Helio, Flam, Sol, Holocaust, inferno, in, barbecue

5. Looking Spec, Scope, Vid (Vis), Orama, Iris, Roy G Biv

6. Numbers I Bi, 2, tw, mono, 1, uni, (unicorn)

7. Numbers II Pan, Poly, Multi, Ambi (Amphi), Googol, Semi, Hemi, Half,

8. Numbers III 100, cent, Dec, Quadr, Quart, 4, tri, triskaidekaphobia, trivia, square, all,

9. Walk and Run Gress, Grad, Cur, Drom, Fug, Ambul

10. Water Aqua, Mar, Flu, Sea, Und, Hydr, H_{2}O, Hydra, diluv, antediluvian

11. Time Pre, Post, A.M., P.M., chron, temp, daisy

12. Cutting Tom, sect, guillotine, atom, cis, ec, nostril

13. Animals I pecu, anim, can(cyn), mus, -ine, goose bumps, dandelion, zo, Kangaroo, impecunious, parroting, ferret, badger, Cancer, Taurus, Ares, Pisces, Leo, Scorpio, Capricorn,

14. Animals II bio, anim, drom, greg, skunk, gnu, hippodrome, gaggle, school, flock, herd, swarm, pack, colony, pride, leap, gam, crash, piggy bank, monkey wrench, etc.

15. Serendipity serendipity, volcano, Asian characters, English logograms, atom, water idioms, Anatomy, Avocado, Mark Twain

16. Nature earth, geo, nat, aaron, navidad, terr, eco (oiko), bio, Copernicus, Galileo

17. Leading duc, agog, pedagogy, crat, cracy, reg, pop

18. Transportation I mov (mob), pilgrim, itinerary, taxi, mot, canoe, sail, sale, Ms. Hyperbole, horse-hippodrome again.-dromedary

19. Transportation II peregrination, port, it, auto, ski, sport, fug,

20. Position sta, pos, sed, couch, davenport, sofa, chesterfield, divan, side, Ms. Hyperbole,

21. Form lic (ly), morph, form, gon, platypus, metamorphosis, egg, Ms. Hyperbole, Mr. Redundant,

22. Size min, equ, equilibrium, mega, magn, Mr. Alliteration, sighs, Charlemagne, Procrustes, Mr. Redundant, pneumonoultramicroscopicsilicovolcanoconiosis, ushers

23. Talking loqu, echo, ventriloquist, log, dict, allowed, Mr. Alliteration,

24. Potpourri potpourri, carob, carat, Mr. Alliteration, Camelia, Ohm, Ampere, Volt, Nickname, Meander, Versus,

25. Food carn, coct, herb, omni, vor, sal, chili, sandwich, pancakes, griddlecakes, hotcakes, battercakes, flapjacks

26. Twist and Turn vers, vert, contortionist, trop, Philadelphia, tor, Ms. Hyperbole, wring, tropaion (trophy), versus, nasturtium,

27. Relatives mother, ped, pater, mater, Mr. Alliteration,

28. Connection together, con, syn, her, (gather), pan, co-op, interdigitation, concatenation, tide, Macadam,

29. Measure and Metrics score, hectometer, milli, odometer, meter, foot, hand, ell, hug (fathom), sighs, score, mile,

30. Communication television, scrib, tele, med, graph, her, tattoo, googol, buncombe (bunk)
