= Robert Black Smith =

Canadian politician (1872–1931)

Member of the Legislative Assembly of New Brunswick
- In office 1917–1925 Serving with David W. Mersereau
- Constituency: Sunbury

Personal details
- Born: July 12, 1872 Blissville Parish, New Brunswick
- Died: January 29, 1931 (aged 58) Saint John, New Brunswick
- Party: New Brunswick Liberal Association
- Spouse: Annie Knorr (m. 1897)
- Children: 4
- Occupation: Lumberman

Robert Black Smith (July 12, 1872 – January 29, 1931) was a Canadian politician. He served in the Legislative Assembly of New Brunswick from 1917 to 1925 as member of the Liberal party. He died in 1931.
