= R.G. Smith Award =

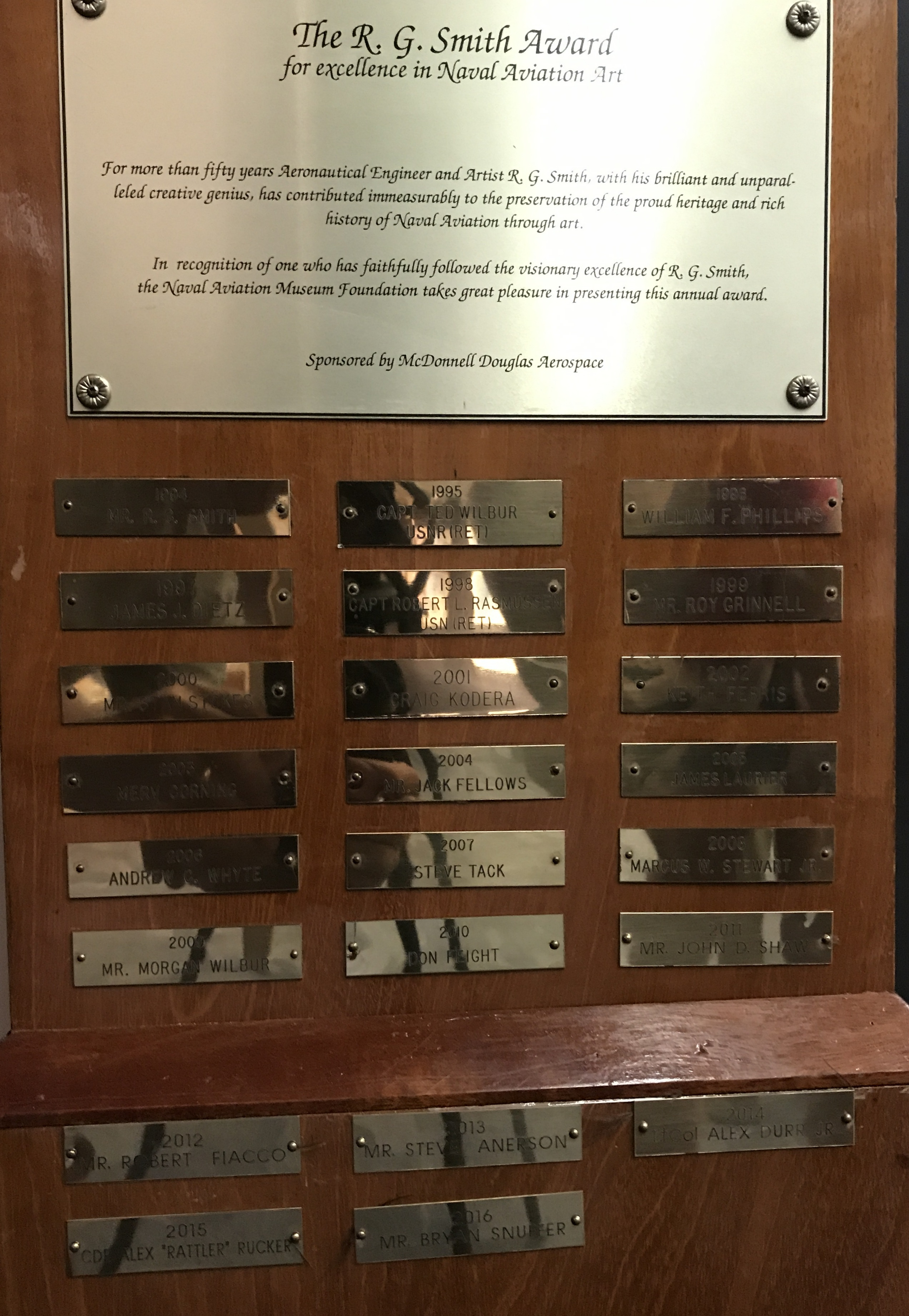
- Awarded for: Excellence in aviation art
- Country: United States
- Presented by: National Naval Aviation Museum
- First award: 1994

The R.G. Smith Award for “excellence in naval aviation art” is awarded annually to a single artist at the National Naval Aviation Museum during its annual May symposium in Pensacola, Florida. The Museum’s Foundation selects the recipient. The award is a career honor, similar to a lifetime achievement award.

== Recipients ==
- 1994: Robert G. Smith
- 1995: Ted Wilbur
- 1996: William S. Phillips
- 1997: James Dietz
- 1998: Bob Rasmussen
- 1999: Roy Grinnell
- 2000: Stan Stokes
- 2001: Craig Kodera
- 2002: Keith Ferris
- 2003: Merv Corning
- 2004: Jack Fellows
- 2005: Jim Laurier
- 2006: Andrew Whyte
- 2007: Steven Tack
- 2008: Marc Stewart
- 2009: Morgan I. Wilbur
- 2010: John Shaw
- 2011: Don Feight
- 2012 Bob Fiacco
- 2013 Steve Anderson
- 2014 LtCol Alex Durr Jr
- 2015 Commander Alex "Rattler" Rucker, USN (Ret.)
- 2016 Bryan David Snuffer

== Namesake ==
Robert Grant or R.G. Smith contributed immeasurably to the preservation of the heritage and history of U.S. naval aviation through his 50-plus year career as an aeronautical engineer and as an accomplished artist. The R.G. Smith Award for “excellence in naval aviation art” is bestowed by the National Museum of Naval Aviation in his honor.

R.G. Smith graduated with a degree in mechanical engineering from the Polytechnic College of Engineering in Oakland in 1934. He was hired in 1936 as an engineer by Northrop Aircraft, then a subsidiary of Douglas Aircraft, where he helped design naval aircraft such as the SBD Dauntless, AD Skyraider, F4D Skyray, A-3 Skywarrior, and the A-4 Skyhawk.

Later, he became the Douglas Company's full-time artist, spent time as a combat artist in Vietnam, and was one of the five original founders of the American Society of Aviation Artists. More than a million of his lithographs of commercial and military aircraft have been printed.

R.G. Smith died at his home in Rancho Mirage, California on May 29, 2001 at the age of 87.

A selection of over 120 of his paintings and drawings, as well as a complete biography can be found in "R.G. Smith - The Man and his Art: An Autobiography". Hardcover: 112 pages, Schiffer Publishing (February 1999), ISBN 0-7643-0755-X, ISBN 978-0-7643-0755-3.

R.G. Smith was designated Honorary Naval Aviator Number 11 on May 8, 1973 by VADM William D. Houser, Deputy Chief of Naval Operations for Air Warfare.
