= Conrad Lau =

American aeronautical engineer and executive

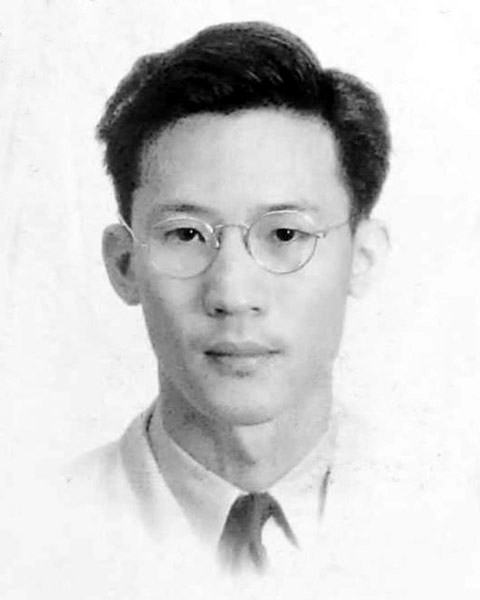
- Conrad Lau citizenship paperwork photo
- Born: Conrad Albert Lau; February 8, 1921; Port-of-Spain, Trinidad
- Died: April 18, 1964 (aged 43)
- Resting place: Restland Memorial Park Dallas, TX
- Education: Queen's Royal College; Massachusetts Institute of Technology
- Spouse: Nancy Page Lau
- Children: Conrad, Jr.; Sally; Michael
- Parent(s): Mr. and Mrs. Egbert Lau
- Engineering career
- Discipline: Aeronautical engineering
- Employer(s): Chance Vought Aircraft; Ling-Temco-Vought
- Projects: F4U Corsair; F7U Cutlass; F8U Crusader; A-7 Corsair II; XF8U-3 Crusader III; Project MALLAR

Conrad Albert 'Connie' Lau (February 8, 1921 – April 18, 1964) was an American aeronautical engineer, inventor, and executive. Lau led or contributed to the development of a number of important aircraft and spacecraft projects.

== Early life ==
Conrad Lau was born on February 8, 1921, in Port-of-Spain, Trinidad, then part of the British West Indies, to Mr. and Mrs. Egbert Lau. He had three brothers: Neil, Roy and John.

Lau attended school in Trinidad through his sophomore year at Queen's Royal College, transferring to the Massachusetts Institute of Technology in his junior year. Lau received his bachelor's degree in Mechanical Engineering in 1942 and his master's degree in Aeronautical Engineering in 1943.

== Career at Chance Vought ==
Lau joined the Chance Vought aircraft corporation upon graduation from MIT in 1943. He devoted his entire professional career to the company. He advanced from the position of Junior Aerodynamics Engineer to Director of the US Navy VAL Light Attack Aircraft program.

Lau made significant contributions to the US aircraft programs beginning with the F4U Corsair of World War II.

=== Crusader aircraft ===
Continuing with the F7U Cutlass and the F8U Crusader aircraft, Lau directed the Vought VAL Light Attack Aircraft Program. The program was Vought's response to the US Navy's request for a light attack aircraft based on an existing design to keep costs down. Vought's design based on the F-8 Crusader won the competition and the A-7 Corsair II was born. The resulting A-7 series aircraft were supplied to both the US Navy and the US Air Force. Lau was one of three people named in US design patent 178,220, for the 'ornamental design' of the Crusader.

Lau was the Chief Project Engineer on the Vought XF8U-3 Crusader III.

=== Apollo program ===
With Tom Dolan, Lau played a key role in the early mission studies for the Apollo program. They authored a critical January 1960 study, Technical Proposal for Manned Multi Modular Spacecraft (Project MALLAR), which outlined Project MALLAR (Manned Lunar Landing and Return). This was the first Lunar Orbit Rendezvous (LOR) mission profile: the Moon landing would be carried out by the very smallest lander module possible, with the main vehicle for flight to and from the Moon remaining in orbit. The lander would then take-off from the Moon and rendezvous with the main vehicle before the crew returned to Earth. (Note: Apollo would take this even further, with a Lander which split into separate Descent and Ascent stages. MALLAR used a single combined stage with droppable landing gear and fuel tankage, but a single engine for both phases. For Apollo, the Descent stage mass, with all fuel and stores to be either used or left on the Moon, became twice the mass of the minimal Ascent stage. Apollo also used separate engines, the lift engine being able to be much smaller and simpler, without either throttling or gimballing.) This was a change from previous 'direct ascent' profiles which had landed the main vehicle on the Moon, then required the take-off of a much heavier vehicle. LOR depended on a modular spacecraft concept, as would then be used for Apollo. NASA developed this with Command, Service and Lunar modules. This early work by engineers like Lau helped to convince John Houbolt and others that LOR was the best way to get to the moon.

== Personal life and death ==
Lau and his wife Nancy Page Lau had three children, Conrad, Jr., Sally and Michael.

He was a charter member of the Dallas Ski Club and the Dallas Sailing Club. Lau studied music in his spare time and was an accomplished guitar player.

Conrad Lau died of cancer on April 18, 1964.

== Memberships ==
- Associate fellow of the American Institute of Aeronautics and Astronautics
- Advisory member of the NASA Committee on Aerodynamics and Aircraft Design
- Member of Tau Beta Pi

== See also ==
- Apollo spacecraft feasibility study
- Yuri Kondratyuk
