= Aerojet M-1 =

One of the largest rocket engines to be designed

M-1
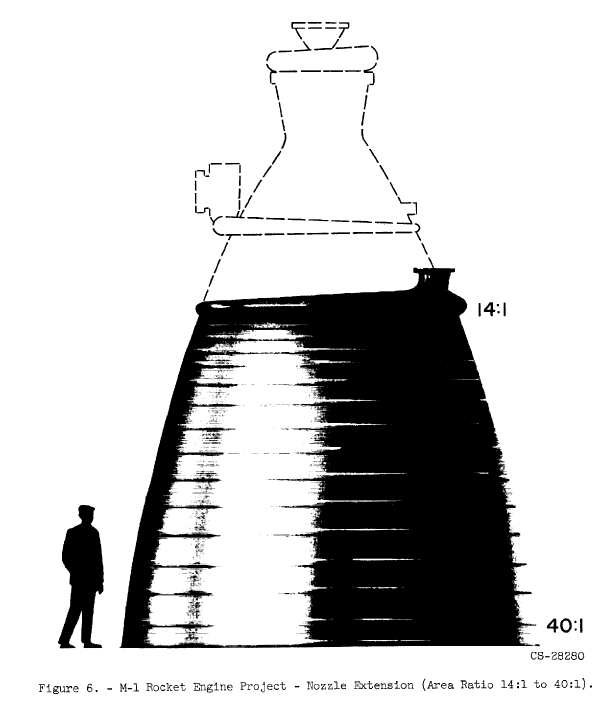
- M-1 rocket engine specifications
- Country of origin: United States
- First flight: Development abandoned at pre-prototype stage
- Manufacturer: Aerojet
- Status: Abandoned in development stage

Liquid-fuel engine
- Propellant: LOX / LH_{2}
- Cycle: Gas-generator

Performance
- Thrust, vacuum: 1,500,000 lb_{f} (6.7 MN)
- Thrust-to-weight ratio: 60
- Chamber pressure: 1,000 psi (6,900 kPa)
- Specific impulse, vacuum: 428 s (4.20 km/s)

Dimensions
- Length: 7.72 m (25.3 ft)
- Diameter: 4.28 m (14.0 ft)
- Dry mass: 9,100 kg (20,000 lb)

The Aerojet M-1 was one of the largest and most powerful liquid-hydrogen-fueled liquid-fuel rocket engines to be designed and component-tested. It was originally developed during the 1950s by the US Air Force. The M-1 offered a baseline thrust of 1,500,000 pounds-force (6.7 MN) and an immediate growth target of 1,800,000 lb_{f} (8 MN). If built, the M-1 would have been larger and more efficient than the famed F-1 that powered the first stage of the Saturn V rocket to the Moon.

== History ==
The M-1 traces its history to US Air Force studies from the late 1950s for its launch needs in the 1960s. By 1961 these had evolved into the Space Launcher System design. The SLS consisted of a series of four rocket designs, all built around a series of solid-fuel boosters and liquid-hydrogen-powered upper stages.

The smallest model, intended to launch the Dyna-Soar, used two 100-inch (2,500 mm) solids and an "A" liquid core. To power the "A" booster, Aerojet was contracted to convert an LR-87, used in the Titan II missile, to run on liquid hydrogen. A prototype was successfully tested between 1958 and 1960. Initial studies of the 100-inch (2,500 mm) solid were also handed to Aerojet, starting in 1959.

The SLS also envisioned a number of much larger designs intended to launch the Air Force's Lunex Project crewed lunar landing. Lunex was a direct landing mission, in which a single very large spacecraft would fly to the Moon, land, and return. In order to launch such a design to low Earth orbit (LEO), a very large booster with a 125,000 lb (57,000 kg) payload would be required. These larger SLS designs followed the same basic outline as the smaller Dynasoar booster, but used much more powerful 180-inch (4,600 mm) solids and the "B" and "C" liquid stages. To provide the required power, the liquid stages mounted a cluster of twelve J-2s. To reduce this complexity, the Air Force also had Aerojet start studies of a much larger hydrogen-fueled design that would replace the twelve J-2s with only two engines. These initial studies would eventually emerge as the M-1, with a thrust of 1.2 million pounds force.

When NASA formed in 1958, they also started planning for a lunar landing. Like the Air Force, their Project Apollo initially favoured a direct ascent profile, requiring a large booster to launch the spacecraft into LEO. Prior to NASA taking over Wernher von Braun's Saturn work for the US Army, they had no large rocket designs of their own, and started a study program known as Nova to study a range of options. Initially, the payload requirements were fairly limited, and the favoured Nova designs used a first stage with four F-1 engines and a payload of about 50,000 lb (23,000 kg). These designs were presented to President Dwight D. Eisenhower on January 27, 1959.

However, the Apollo spacecraft requirements quickly grew, settling on a 10,000 lb (4,500 kg) spacecraft (the CSM) with a three-person crew. To launch such a craft to the Moon required a massive 125,000 lb (57,000 kg) payload to LEO. Nova designs of this capability were quickly presented with up to eight F-1 engines, along with much more powerful upper stages that demanded the M-1 engine. Thus, for a brief period, the M-1 was used on the baseline designs for both NASA's and the Air Force's lunar programs.

In 1961, President John F. Kennedy announced the goal of landing a person on the Moon before the decade was out. After a brief argument, NASA won the mission over the Air Force. However, Nova would require massive manufacturing capability that did not currently exist, and it was not clear that booster construction could be started in time for a landing before 1970. By 1962 they had decided to use von Braun's Saturn V design, which went through a process of re-design to produce a usable booster that could be built in the existing facilities at Michoud, Louisiana.

=== Uprating thrust, then cancellation ===
With the selection of Saturn for the lunar missions, work on Nova turned to the post-Apollo era. The designs were re-targeted for crewed planetary expeditions, namely a crewed landing on Mars. Even utilizing a lightweight mission profile like that selected for Apollo, a Mars mission required a truly massive payload of about one million pounds to low Earth orbit. This led to a second series of design studies, also known as Nova, although they were essentially unrelated to the earlier designs.

Many of the new designs used the M-1 as their second-stage engine, although demanding much higher payloads. In order to meet these goals, the M-1 project was uprated from 1.2 million pounds force to a nominal 1.5 million pounds force, and the designers deliberately added more turbopump capability to allow it to expand to at least 1.8 million and potentially up to 2.0 million pounds force. Additionally, the M-1 was even considered for a number of first-stage designs, in place of the F-1 or the 180-inch (4,600 mm) solids. For this role the specific impulse was dramatically reduced, and it appears that some consideration was given to various expanding nozzle designs to address this.

M-1 development continued through this period, although as the Apollo program expanded, NASA started cutting funding to the M-1 project in order to complete Saturn-related developments first. In 1965, another NASA project studied advanced versions of the Saturn, replacing the cluster of five J-2s on the S-II second stage with one M-1, five J-2Ts (an improved version of the J-2 with an aerospike nozzle), or a high-pressure engine known as the HG-3, which would later become the direct predecessor of the Space Shuttle's SSME.

By 1966 it was clear that present funding levels for NASA would not be maintained in the post-Apollo era. The Nova design studies ended that year, and the M-1 along with it. The last M-1 contract expired on August 24, 1965, although testing continued on existing funds until August 1966. Studies on the J-2T ended at the same time. Although the HG-3 was never built, its design formed the basis for the Space Shuttle Main Engine.

The final report (1966) found:

1. The feasibility of all major M-1 Engine components, except for the cooled chamber and the gas-cooled skirt, was demonstrated.
2. Performance data were obtained and the mechanical integrity was established for the injector, the fuel turbopump, the oxidizer turbopump, and the gas generator assembly. Also, it was established that these components are satisfactory for use in a demonstration engine.

=== Prototypes ===
Over the three-year lifetime of the project, a total of eight combustion chambers were built (two of them uncooled test units), eleven gas generators, four oxygen pumps, as well as four hydrogen pumps that were in the process of being completed.

Scaled down models of the pumps were used during design/development to 1963.

== Description ==
The M-1 used the gas-generator cycle, burning some of its liquid hydrogen and oxygen in a small combustor to provide hot gases for running the fuel pumps. In the case of the M-1, the hydrogen and oxygen turbopumps were completely separate, each using their own turbine, rather than running both off a common power shaft. The hydrogen and oxygen pumps were some of the most powerful ever built at the time, producing 75,000 horsepower (56,000 kW) for the former, and 27,000 hp (20,000 kW) for the latter.

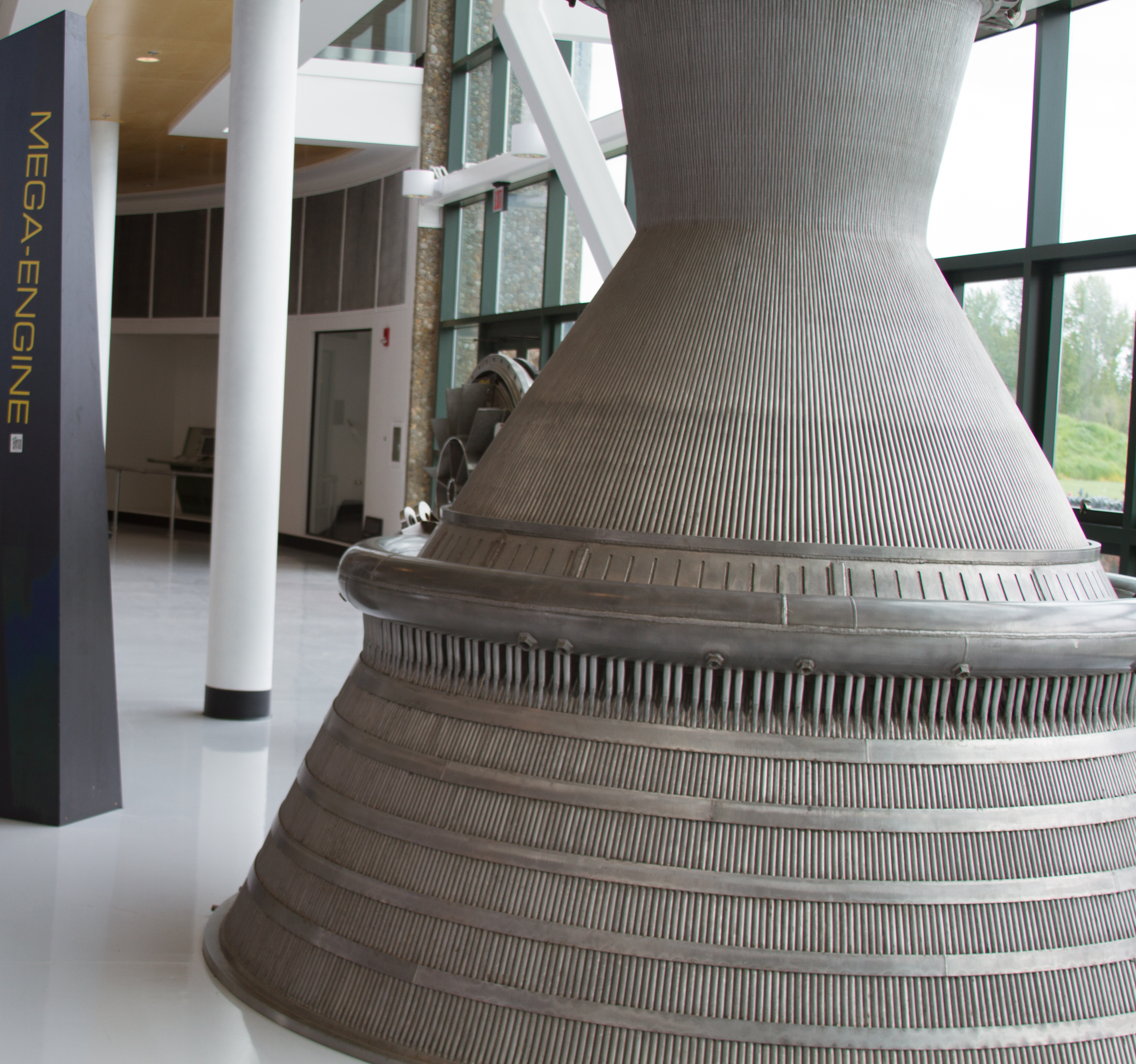
M-1 rocket engine display at Evergreen Aviation & Space Museum

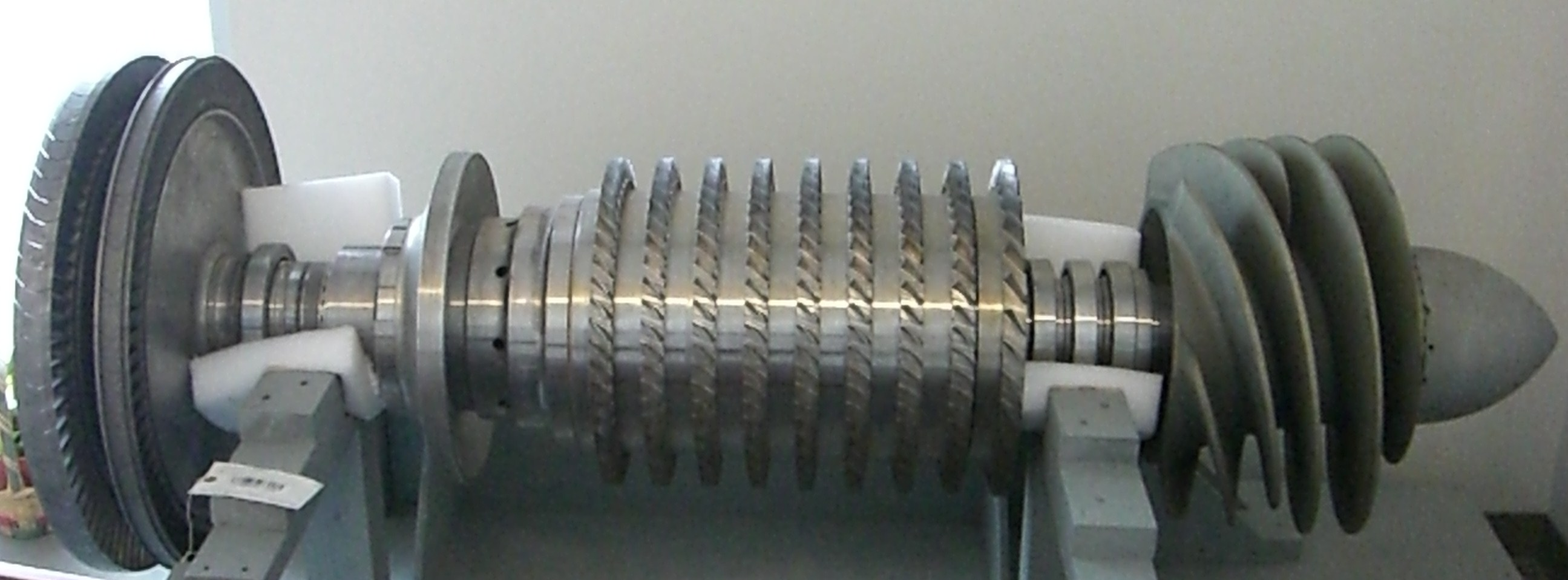
A turbopump designed and built for the M-1 rocket engine

In most American designs, a gas-generator engine would dump the exhaust from the turbines overboard. In the case of the M-1, the resulting exhaust was relatively cool, and was instead directed into cooling pipes on the lower portion of the engine skirt. This meant that liquid hydrogen was needed for cooling only on the high-heat areas of the engine—the combustion chamber, nozzle and upper part of the skirt—reducing plumbing complexity considerably. The gas entered the skirt area at about 700 °F (370 °C), heating to about 1,000 °F (540 °C) before being dumped through a series of small nozzles at the end of the skirt. The exhaust added 28,000 lbf (120 kN) of thrust.

The engine was started by rotating the pumps to operating speed using helium gas stored in a separate high-pressure container. This started the fuel flow into the main engine and gas generator. The main engine was ignited by a spray of sparks directed into the combustion chamber from a pyrotechnic device. Shutdown was achieved by simply turning off the fuel flow to the gas generator, allowing the pumps to slow down on their own.

The use of separate turbopumps and other components allowed the various parts of the M-1 to be built and tested individually.

=== Combustion chamber and injectors ===
- Thrust: 1.5 M lb (at 200,000 ft)
- Thrust chamber pressure: 1,000 psi (6,900 kPa) absolute, 1,200 psi (8,300 kPa) for 1.8 M lb version
- Thrust chamber diameter: 42 inches (1.1 m)
- Thrust chamber material: 200 tubes of 347 stainless steel, in an Inconel 718 bolt-on jacket.
- Injector type: coaxial
- Injector body material: 347 stainless steel
- Number of Injector elements: 1,200 to 3,000 anticipated
- Nozzle throat diameter:

=== Gas generator ===
- Burns 110 lb/s (oxidiser:fuel, 0.8)
- Exhaust pressure: 1,100 psi (7.6 MPa)
- Exhaust temperature: 1,000 °F (540 °C)
- Gas generator exhaust fed back into lower nozzle for cooling

=== LOX turbopump ===
- Axial flow
- RPM: 36,700
- Input pressure: 30 ft LOX; i.e. 1.00 atm
- Pressure increase: 3,400 ft LOX; i.e. 1,600 psi; 11 MPa; 110 bar
- Flow rate: up to 3,000 lb/sec, 2,921 lb/s nominal
- Axial thrust load on bearings: in excess of 30,000 lb
- Bearings: oxygen lubricated, 440C stainless steel balls, with "glass filled Teflon cages"

=== LH_{2} turbopump ===
- 2 stage turbine with 10 stage axial flow pump

== See also ==
- Comparison of orbital rocket engines

== Bibliography ==
- Dankhoff, Walter F. (October 1963). The M-1 Rocket Engine Project (PDF). Washington, D.C.: NASA. Archived from the original (PDF) on 2015-01-05.
- Mechanical design of the M-1 axial flow liquid hydrogen fuel pump
- Development of a 1,500,000-lb-thrust /nominal vacuum/ liquid hydrogen/liquid oxygen engine Final report, 30 Apr. 1962 - 4 Aug. 1966/ NASA document covering the M-1 Project from inception to completion. 406p
- Activation and initial test operations, large rocket engine - Turbopump test facilities Technology report Aerojet General report on the development of the test facilities for the M-1 Turbopump
- Activation and Initial Test Operations, Large Rocket Engine - Thrust Chamber Test Facilities Technology Report Aerojet General report on the development of the test facilities for the M-1 Thrust Chamber
- Development of LO2/LH2 Gas Generators for the M-1 Engine NASA document covering the development of the gas generators for the M-1 engine
- Development of liquid oxygen/liquid hydrogen thrust chamber for the M-1 engine NASA document covering the development of the M-1 thrust chamber
- Design study of modification of m-1 liquid hydrogen turbopump for use in nuclear reactor test facility
- Analytical and experimental vibration analysis of the turbine buckets for the M-1 liquid oxygen turbopump
- Economic analysis of Perlite versus super insulation in liquid hydrogen storage and run vessels for the M-1 Program
- Aerodynamic design and estimated performance of a two-stage Curtis turbine for the liquid oxygen turbopump of the M-1 engine
- Investigation of the starting characteristics of the M-1 rocket engine using the analog computer
- Analysis of the M-1 liquid hydrogen turbopump shaft critical whirling speed and bearing loads
- Cold-air performance evaluation of scale model oxidizer pump-drive turbine for the M-1 hydrogen-oxygen rocket engine. I - Inlet feedpipe-manifold assembly
- Cold-air performance evaluation of scale model oxidizer pump-drive turbine for the M-1 hydrogen-oxygen rocket engine. II - Overall two-stage performance
- Cold-air performance evaluation of scale model oxidizer pump-drive turbine for the M-1 hydrogen-oxygen rocket engine. III - Performance of first stage with inlet-feedpipe-manifold assembly
- Cold-air performance evaluation of scale model oxidizer pump-drive turbine for the M-1 hydrogen-oxygen rocket engine. IV - Performance of first stage with modified inlet feedpipe-manifold assembly
- Design and development of liquid hydrogen cooled 120mm roller, 110mm roller, and 110mm tandem ball bearings for M-1 fuel turbopump
- Valve lipseals M-1 sleeve-type thrust chamber valve
- Development of liquid oxygen cooled 110MM roller and tandem ball bearings at up to .5 x 106 DN values for the oxidizer turbopump of the M-1 engine Technology report
- Aerodynamic design - Model II turbine M-1 fuel turbopump assembly
- Analysis and experimental verification of axial thrust on the M-1 liquid oxygen turbopump
- M-1 engine test complex data acquisition systems
- The mechanical design of a two-stage impulse turbine for the liquid hydrogen turbopump of the M-1 engine
- Summary of observed results when chilling the M-1 fuel turbopump to liquid hydrogen temperature
- Mechanical design of a Curtis turbine for the oxidizer turbopump of the M-1 engine
- Hydraulic design of the M-1 liquid hydrogen turbopump
- Summary of materials technology of M-1 engine
- Cooled baffle development for M-1 engine using a subscale rocket engine
- M-1 injector development - Philosophy and implementation
- Cold-air performance evaluation of a scale- model fuel pump turbine for the M-1 hydrogen-oxygen rocket engine
- Application of Alloy 718 in M-1 engine components
- M-1 engine subscale injector tests
- Scale model study of flow patterns in the inlet manifold of the fuel pump drive turbine for the M-1 hydrogen-oxygen rocket engine
- M-1 injector development - Philosophy and implementation
- Hydrogen gas pressure vessel problems in the M-1 facilities
- Spin Test of Turbine Rotor NASA Contractor Report into spin tests of the turbine built for the M-1 Oxidizer Turbopump dated February 1972
