= Tom Dolan (engineer) =

American aerospace engineer

Thomas E. Dolan was an American engineer who proposed the first fully developed concept of lunar orbit rendezvous for the Apollo program while working at Vought Astronautics.

Dolan referred to his LOR study concept as Manned Lunar Landing and Return (MALLAR), and it was largely ignored by NASA administrators until John Houbolt, an engineer at NASA Langley, began championing the concept in 1961. The proposed idea outlined a smaller spacecraft dedicated only to operate in the vacuum of space. This spacecraft could act as sort of a shuttle between an orbiting "command module" in Lunar orbit and the surface of the Moon. Following this mission profile required the Command/Service Module and Lunar Module to fly to the Moon together and undock while in lunar orbit, at which point the Lunar Module would land on the Moon.

To return to the command module, the Lunar Module would lift off into lunar orbit and perform an orbital rendezvous. The lander's ascent stage would then be left behind in orbit, and the crew would return to Earth in the Command/Service Module. While this method saved a lot of weight in propellant and spacecraft mass, it did not gain widespread acceptance early on. The risks associated with Lunar orbit rendezvous were initially considered unacceptable by NASA officials. The Gemini missions would later prove that rendezvous and docking was indeed possible in space, paving the way for Dolan's idea to be put into practice.

== In popular culture ==
In the fifth episode of the 1998 HBO mini-series From the Earth to the Moon, entitled "Spider", Tom Dolan is portrayed by Alan Ruck.

== See also ==
- Conrad Lau
