= Alan Ruck =

American actor (born 1956)

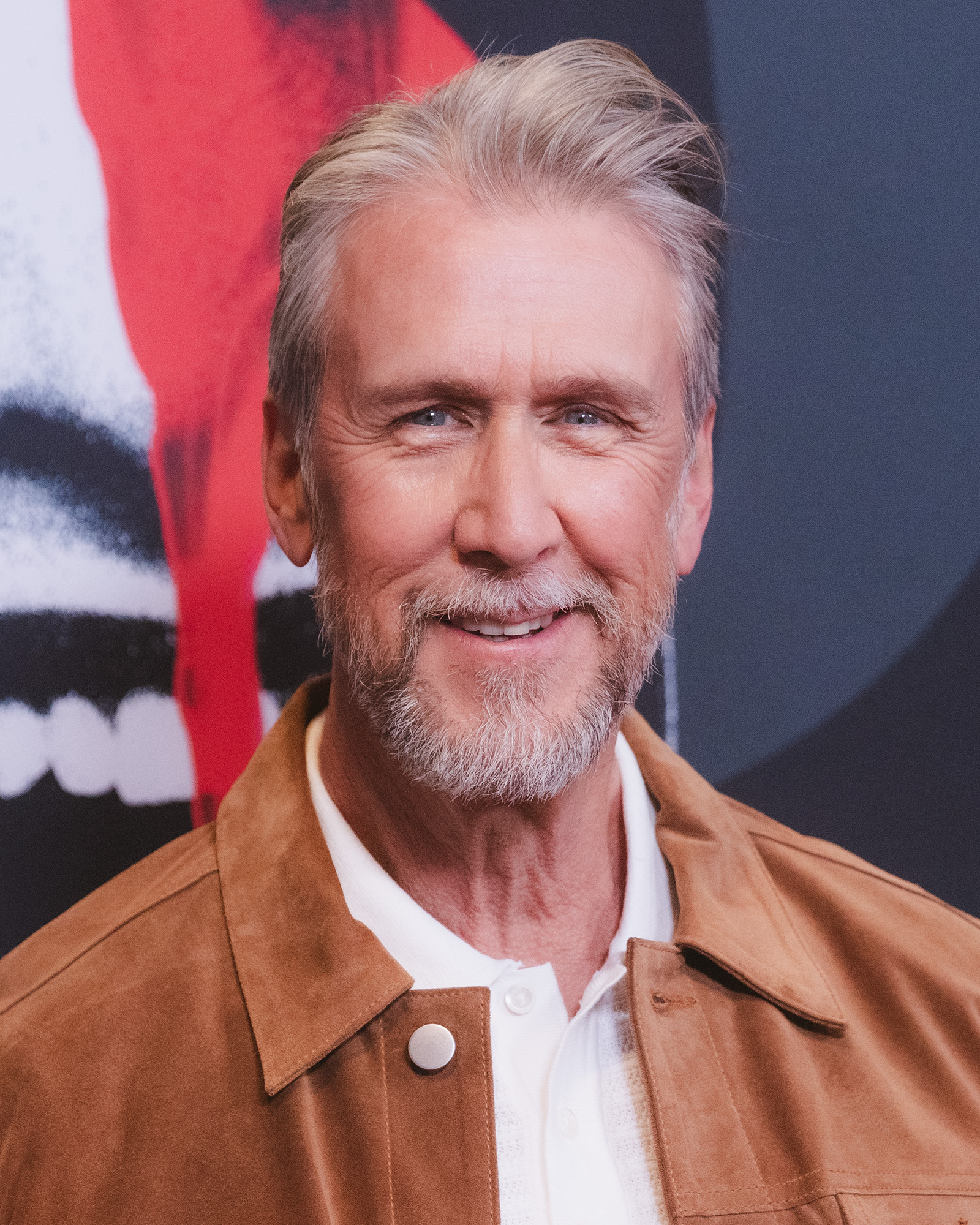
- Ruck in 2026
- Born: Alan Douglas Ruck; July 1, 1956 (age 70); Cleveland, Ohio, U.S.
- Education: University of Illinois Urbana-Champaign (BFA)
- Occupation: Actor
- Years active: 1983–present
- Spouses: Claudia Stefany (m. 1984; div. 2005); Mireille Enos (m. 2008)
- Children: 4

Alan Douglas Ruck (born July 1, 1956) is an American actor. He is known for portraying Cameron Frye in John Hughes' film Ferris Bueller's Day Off (1986), as well as television roles as Stuart Bondek on the ABC sitcom Spin City (1996–2002) and Connor Roy on the HBO series Succession (2018–2023), the latter earning him Primetime Emmy and Golden Globe Award nominations. His other film credits include Class (1983), Bad Boys (1983), Three Fugitives (1989), Young Guns II (1990), Speed (1994), Star Trek Generations (1994), and Twister (1996).

== Early life ==
Alan Ruck was born in Cleveland, Ohio, to a schoolteacher mother and a father who worked for a pharmaceutical company. He attended Parma Senior High School in Parma, Ohio, and graduated from the University of Illinois with a B.F.A. in drama in 1979. He later recalled:

After school, I went up to Chicago, because I didn't really know anybody in New York or Los Angeles, and I knew people who were doing plays in Chicago. So I went up there, and I knocked around a little bit. And I guess about a year after I was out of school, I got my first job.

== Career ==
Ruck's first film role was in the 1983 drama film Bad Boys, in which he played Carl Brennan, Sean Penn's friend in the film. The same year, he played Roger Jackson in Class.

Ruck made his Broadway debut in 1985 in Neil Simon's Biloxi Blues with Matthew Broderick. He was soon a stage actor at theaters around the U.S., including the Wisdom Bridge Theatre in Chicago.

Ruck played Cameron Frye in John Hughes' 1986 comedy Ferris Bueller's Day Off, as the title character's hypochondriac best friend, after Broderick encouraged him to audition for the role; their real-life friendship was reportedly a factor in Ruck being cast. One of his other film roles was in the 1987 film Three for the Road.

Ruck later appeared in the 1989 comedy film Three Fugitives. Following that, he played Hendry William French in Young Guns II, the 1990 sequel to Young Guns. He played Captain Jonathan Harriman of the USS Enterprise-B in the 1994 film Star Trek Generations, a role that he reprised, along with Generations co-star Walter Koenig and other Trek alumni, in the fan film Of Gods and Men. Alan played an annoying tourist named Doug Stephens on an ill-fated bus in the 1994 blockbuster Speed. Another supporting role was of the eccentric storm chaser Robert 'Rabbit' Nurick in the 1996 disaster film Twister.

From 1990 to 1991, Ruck starred as Chicago ad man Charlie Davis, in the ABC series Going Places. ABC canceled the series after one season. He appeared in the series Daddy's Girls in 1994, which was canceled after three episodes. From 1996 to 2002, Alan played Stuart Bondek in the sitcom Spin City alongside Michael J. Fox and later, Charlie Sheen. In 2005, he played Leo Bloom in the Broadway version of Mel Brooks' The Producers, a role also played by Broderick, his Ferris Bueller co-star.

Ruck was then cast in the pilot of the Tim Minear-created Fox Network series Drive, but did not appear in the series. He also starred in one episode of the Comedy Central sitcom Stella as Richard, a man looking for work. He later starred in the season two Scrubs episode "My Lucky Day" as a patient, and played reporter Steve Jacobson on the ESPN miniseries The Bronx Is Burning.

In 1998, Ruck guest-starred in the fifth episode of the HBO miniseries From the Earth to the Moon as the NASA engineer Tom Dolan.

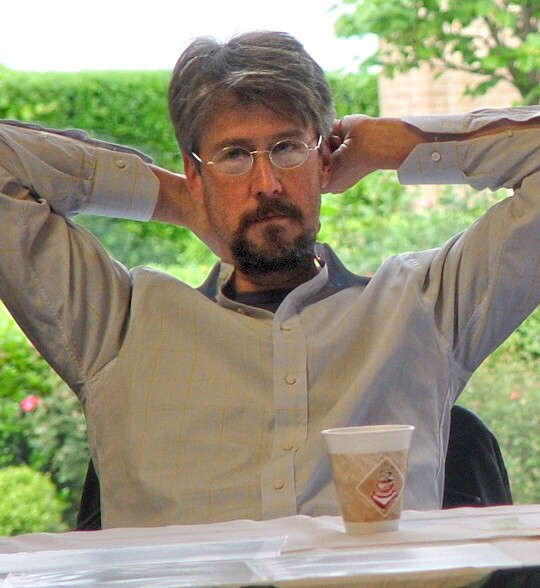
Ruck in 2006

In 2006, Ruck guest-starred in a single episode of Stargate Atlantis called "The Real World" and, in 2007, as unscrupulous property developer Albert Bunford in an episode of Medium.

In the 2007 comedy Kickin' It Old Skool, he appears as Dr. Frye, a possible connection to Cameron Frye; he even mentions still trying to pay off an old Ferrari, a reference to Cameron totaling his dad's Ferrari in Ferris Bueller's Day Off.

Ruck played the part of a ghost of a family man in the 2008 film Ghost Town, which starred Ricky Gervais. Ruck also had a small role in the 2008 M. Night Shyamalan film The Happening.

In 2009, he had a minor role as Frank in an episode of Cougar Town, who has problems with his marriage due to a crush he had long ago on Jules, played by Courteney Cox. He played the role of Dean Bowman in the college fraternity drama Greek. He appeared in a guest role as a manic geologist in an episode of Eureka. He played Mr. Cooverman in the film I Love You, Beth Cooper. In 2009, Ruck filmed the medical drama Extraordinary Measures in Portland, Oregon, with star Harrison Ford.

Ruck appeared as a bank robber in a season three episode of the USA Network series Psych, and as a lawyer in season five of the ABC series Boston Legal. He guest-starred as Martin, a magazine reporter, on an episode of Ruby & the Rockits entitled "We Are Family?"

In 2010, Ruck was cast as a lead character in the NBC mystery-drama, Persons Unknown. He guest-starred on the television show Fringe as a scientist turned criminal, in the NCIS: Los Angeles season two episode "Borderline", and guest-starred as ex-money laundering accountant turned dentist on an episode of Justified entitled "Long in the Tooth". He appeared in the Grey's Anatomy season five episode "In The Midnight Hour".

In 2012, Ruck was cast in the ABC Family series Bunheads as the husband to Sutton Foster's character, Michelle. In 2013, he appeared in NCIS, guest-starring in the season 11 episode, "Gut Check".

In autumn 2016, Ruck began a 10-episode run on The Exorcist as Henry Rance, the husband (who has suffered mild brain damage in a vaguely explained accident) of Angela Rance (Geena Davis), better known as the adult Regan MacNeil, the tortured girl (played by Linda Blair) who is possessed by a demon in the 1973 hit film The Exorcist.

From 2018 to 2023, Ruck played the role of Connor Roy, the eldest son of a media magnate, in the HBO series Succession. He was part of the cast's win for the Screen Actors Guild Award for Outstanding Performance by an Ensemble in a Drama Series in 2022 and 2024. In 2023, he received Golden Globe and Emmy nominations for his performance.

== Personal life ==
Ruck was married to actress Claudia Stefany from 1984 to 2005, with whom he has two children. Since 2008, he has been married to actress Mireille Enos, whom he met in 2005 while co-starring in the Broadway revival of Absurd Person Singular. They have two children.

On October 31, 2023, Ruck was involved in a car crash in Los Angeles. For unknown reasons, he lost control, hit several vehicles, and crashed into the side of a pizza restaurant.

== Filmography ==
Key
†	Denotes films that have not yet been released

=== Film ===
Year	Title	Role	Notes
1983	Doctor Detroit	Student	Uncredited
1983	Bad Boys	Carl Brennan	
1983	Class	Roger Jackson	
1986	Ferris Bueller's Day Off	Cameron Frye	
1987	Three for the Road	T.S.	
1989	Three Fugitives	Inspector Tener	
1989	Bloodhounds of Broadway	John Wangle	
1990	Young Guns II	Hendry William French	
1994	Speed	Doug Stephens	
1994	Star Trek Generations	Capt. John Harriman	
1995	Born to Be Wild	Dan Woodley	
1996	Twister	Robert "Rabbit" Nurick	
1998	Walking to the Waterline	Duane Hopwood	
2000	Everything Put Together	Kessel	
2003	Cheaper by the Dozen	Bill Shenk	
2007	Kickin' It Old Skool	Dr. Cameron Frye	
2007	InAlienable	Dr. Proway	
2008	The Happening	School Principal	
2008	Ghost Town	Ghost Dad	
2008	Eavesdrop	Casper	
2008	Star Trek: Of Gods and Men	John Harriman	
2009	I Love You, Beth Cooper	Mr. Cooverman	
2009	Don't You Forget About Me	Himself	Documentary
2010	Extraordinary Measures	Pete Sutphen	
2012	Goats	Dr. Eldridge	
2012	Shanghai Calling	Marcus Groff	
2013	Zombie Night	Joseph	
2015	Deathly	Richard	Short
2016	Carnage Park	Sheriff Wyatt Moss	
2016	Dreamland	Walter	
2017	War Machine	Lt. Gen. Pat McKinnon	
2018	Gringo	Jerry	
2018	Sierra Burgess Is a Loser	Stephen Burgess	
2019	Captive State	Charles Rittenhouse	
2020	Freaky	Mr. Bernardi	
2023	The Burial	Mike Allred	
2025	Oh Yeah!	Himself	Short documentary
2026	People We Meet on Vacation	Jimmy	
2026	Corporate Retreat	Arthur Scott	
2026	In Memoriam	Jeremy Marvin	
2026	Hershey †	Henry Hershey	Post-production
TBA	Wind River: The Next Chapter †	TBA	Post-production
TBA	Goodbye Girl †	TBA	Filming

=== Television ===
Year	Title	Role	Notes
1984	Hard Knox	Frankie Tyrone	Television film
1985	First Steps	Dave	Television film
1988	Shooter	Stork O'Connor	Television film
1989	The Famous Teddy Z	Sheldon Samms	Episode: "Teddy Sells the House"
1990–1991	Going Places	Charlie Davis	19 episodes
1992–1993	The Edge	Various	13 episodes
1993	Picket Fences	Patrick Gatwood	Episode: "Unlawful Entries"
1993	Tales from the Crypt	Carty	Episode: "Oil's Well That Ends Well"
1994	Daddy's Girls	Lenny	3 episodes
1995	Muscle	Dr. Marshall Jones	13 episodes
1995–1996	Mad About You	Lance Brockwell	4 episodes
1996	The Outer Limits	Howard Sharp	Episode: "Unnatural Selection"
1996–2002	Spin City	Stewart Bondek	Main cast; 140 episodes
1998	From the Earth to the Moon	Tom Dolan	Episode: "Spider"
1998	The Ransom of Red Chief	Ambrose Dorset	Television film
2002	Scrubs	Mr. Bragin	Episode: "My Lucky Day"
2003	Queens Supreme	Dr. Katz	Episode: "That Voodoo That You Do"
2005	Stella	Richard	Episode: "Coffee Shop"
2006	Stargate Atlantis	Dr. Fletcher	Episode: "The Real World"
2007	Drive	John Ashton	Episode: "Unaired Pilot"
2007	Medium	Albert Bunford	Episode: "Second Opinion"
2007	The Bronx Is Burning	Reporter Steve Jacobson	8 episodes
2007	Ghost Whisperer	Steve Sinclair	Episode: "Bad Blood"
2007–2011	Greek	Dean Bowman	6 episodes
2008	Eureka	Dr. Hood	Episode: "Best In Faux"
2008	Boston Legal	Wayne Davidson	Episode: "Kill, Baby, Kill!"
2008, 2014	Psych	Phil Stubbins; Ruben Leonard	Episodes: "Gus Walks Into a Bank" / "Remake A.K.A. Cloudy... With a Chance of Improvement"
2009	Ruby & the Rockits	Martin Wexler	Episode: "We Are Family?"
2009	FlashForward	Tomasi	Episode: "White to Play"
2009	Cougar Town	Frank Miller	Episode: "Two Gunslingers"
2010	CSI: Miami	Dr. Allan Beckham	Episode: "Show Stopper"
2010	CSI: Crime Scene Investigation	Buddy Mills	Episode: "Unshockable"
2010	Numbers	Arnold Winslow	Episode: "Growin' Up"
2010	Persons Unknown	Charlie Morse	13 episodes
2010	Rules of Engagement	Dr. Greenblatt	Episode: "The Four Pillars"
2010	Justified	Roland Pike	Episode: "Long in the Tooth"
2010	NCIS: Los Angeles	Donald Wexling	Episode: "Borderline"
2011	Fringe	Dr. Krick	Episode: "Os"
2011	Five	Sam Jarente	Television film
2012	Ben and Kate	Principal Geoff Feeney	Episode: "Bad Cop/Bad Cop"
2012	Hawaii Five-0	Brian Slater	Episode: "Ohuna"
2012–2013	Bunheads	Hubbell Flowers	3 episodes
2013	Hot in Cleveland	Reverend Lare	Episode: "Magic Diet Candy"
2013	Burn Notice	Max Lyster	Episode: "Reckoning"
2013	We Are Men	Minister	Episode: "Pilot"
2013	Zombie Night	Joseph	Television film
2013	Masters of Sex	Psychiatrist	2 episodes
2013	NCIS	Ward Davis	Episode: "Gut Check"
2013	Super Fun Night	Spencer Quinn	Episode: "Merry Super Fun Christmas"
2014	Intelligence	Jonathan Cain	Episode: "Cain and Gabriel"
2014	Instant Mom	Mr. Shank	Episode: "Teacher's Pest"
2015	Hindsight	Harry Lavigne	Episode: "...Then I'll Know"
2015	The Whispers	Alex Myers	4 episodes
2015	Major Crimes	Special Agent Jerry Shea	Episode: "Hostage to Fortune"
2015	Sofia the First	Herb (voice)	2 episodes
2016	The Middle	Mr. Kershaw	Episodes: "Birds of a Feather" and "Film, Friends and Fruit Pies"
2016	Cooper Barrett's Guide to Surviving Life	Mark Barrett	Episode: "How to Survive Your Parents' Visit"
2016	The Catch	Gordon Bailey	Episodes: "The Trial" and "The Happy Couple"
2016	The Exorcist	Henry Rance	10 episodes
2016	The Loud House	Lord Tetherby, Cop (voices)	Episode: "Out on a Limo"
2018	My Dinner with Hervé	Stu Chambers	Television film
2018	Dirty John	John Dzialo	Episode: "One Shoe"
2018–2023	Succession	Connor Roy	Main role
2019	One Day at a Time	Lawrence Schneider	Episode: "The Man"
2022	The Dropout	Jay Rosan	2 episodes
2025	Elsbeth	Bill and Peter Hepson	Episode: "Finance Bros"
2026	Rooster	Dean Vincent Riggs	3 episodes
2026	Iron Man and His Awesome Friends	Odin (voice)	Episode: Thor and the Legends of Asgard

== Awards and nominations ==
Year	Award	Category	Nominated work	Result	Ref.
2022	Screen Actors Guild Awards	Outstanding Performance by an Ensemble in a Drama Series	Succession	Won	
2024	Golden Globe Awards	Best Supporting Actor – Series, Miniseries or Television Film	Succession	Nominated	
2024	Primetime Emmy Awards	Outstanding Supporting Actor in a Drama Series	Succession	Nominated	
2024	Screen Actors Guild Awards	Outstanding Performance by an Ensemble in a Drama Series	Succession	Won	
