= Nova (NASA rocket) =

Proposed United States super heavy-lift launch vehicle

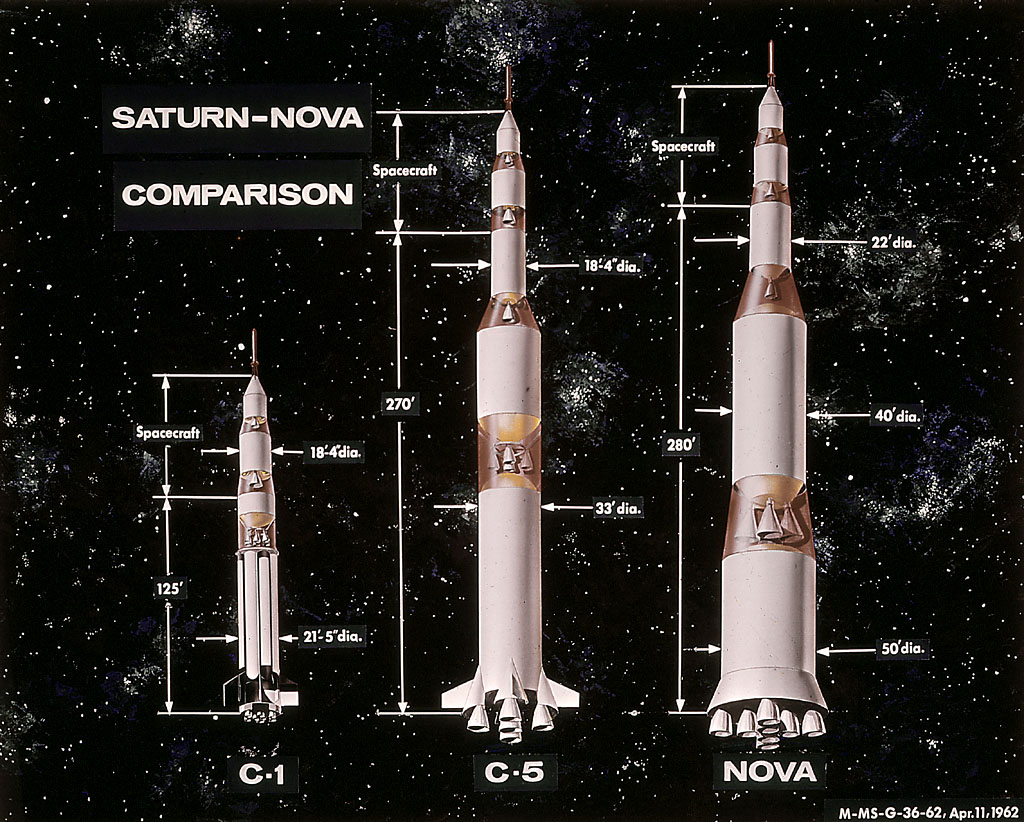
Very early concept diagrams, April 1962, of [from left to right] the Saturn I, Saturn V and "Nova C8" rockets. (Each concept included one additional stage, one that was omitted entirely from the Saturn I and eventually replaced by the Lunar Module Adapter on the Saturn IB and Saturn V.)

Nova was a series of NASA's rocket designs that were proposed both before and after the Saturn V rocket used in the Apollo program. Nova was NASA's first large launcher proposed in 1958, for missions similar to what Saturn V was subsequently used for. The Nova and Saturn V designs closely mirrored each other in basic concept, power, size, and function. Differences were minor but practical, and the Saturn was ultimately selected for the Apollo program, largely because it would reuse existing facilities to a greater extent and could make it to the pad somewhat earlier.

During a series of post-Apollo studies in the late 1960s, considerations for a crewed mission to Mars revealed the need for boosters much larger than Apollo's, and a new series of designs with as many as eight Rocketdyne F-1 engines were developed under the Nova name (along with the Saturn MLV). The image of the Nova C8 is commonly used as a representative of the entire Nova series, and many references to Nova refer specifically to these post-Apollo versions. The two series of designs were, essentially, separate, but shared their name. Thus, "Nova" does not refer to a specific rocket design, just a rocket larger than the Saturn V in most cases. Nova was the name used by NASA in the early 1960s for a super booster in the 10-to-40-million-pound-force (44 to 178 MN) thrust range.

== Lunar rockets ==
The first Nova series was designed in-house at NASA in 1958. This project examined several designs, the smallest having four F-1s in the lower stage and J-2s in the upper stages. This design placed 24 tons in a lunar injection trajectory. These designs were presented to President Dwight D. Eisenhower on January 27, 1959.

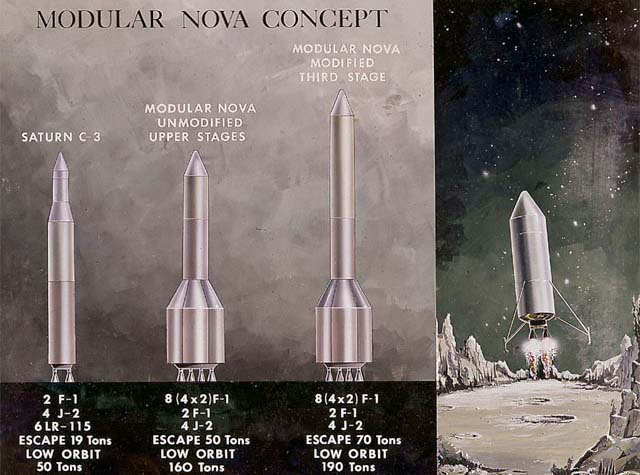
Saturn C-3 and Nova designs (1961)

The Nova designs were not the only lunar rockets being considered at the time. The US Air Force was in the process of defining its Lunex Project, including a massive booster design using a cluster of solid fuel rockets in the lower stage with liquid hydrogen-powered uppers mounting the J-2 or M-1. Meanwhile, at the US Army's Redstone Arsenal, Wernher von Braun was developing his "Juno V" design, using a cluster of Jupiter and Redstone related engines and tanks for a lower stage, a Titan I missile as the second stage.

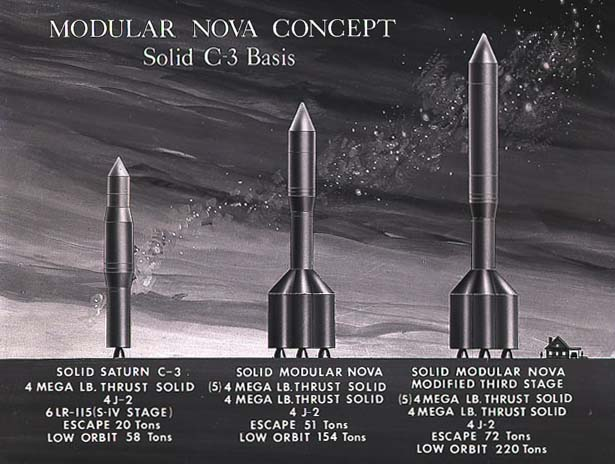
Solid stage Saturn C-3 and Nova designs (1961)

In 1959 the Army decided it was no longer interested in developing large boosters, for which it had no immediate need, and it passed von Braun's team over to NASA. This left NASA with two large booster designs: its own Nova, and von Braun's recently renamed Saturn ("the one after Jupiter"). Over the next two years the competing NASA and Air Force studies continued, but immediately following President John F. Kennedy's call to reach the Moon before the end of the decade, NASA was given the mission and work on Lunex ended.

Originally, NASA had designed Nova for the "direct ascent" mission profile, in which a single large spacecraft would be placed in Earth orbit, and after transferring to a lunar orbit, would land directly on the Moon and take off without the need for rendezvous and docking with multiple spacecraft, which was as yet untried and perceived to be difficult. This greatly increased the liftoff mass of the space vehicle.

Von Braun favored a profile that built up the spacecraft in Earth orbit, which reduced the launch mass needed for any one launch. However, as studies into the spacecraft needed for the mission started, it became clear that the systems would be much heavier than initially suspected; the existing Nova designs were too small, and the original Saturn design would need up to fifteen launches to put all the parts and fuel into orbit. A redesign of both plans followed.

Nova was still targeting the direct ascent approach, which required the most lift capacity. The most powerful of the resulting "normal" designs, the 8L, included eight F-1's in the lower stage and placed 68 tons in a translunar trajectory. Other designs in the series replaced the F-1s with large solids.

General Dynamics proposed nuclear rocket engines for the upper stages. Lunar payload for the various models varied between 48 and 75 tons.

NASA Nova designs, circa 1960
| Design | Stage 1 | Stage 2 | Stage 3 | Stage 4 | Lunar trajectory payload |
|---|---|---|---|---|---|
| Nova 4S | 4 × 240 in (610 cm) Solid-propellant | 2 × M-1 | 1 × J-2 | - | 166,000 lb (75,300 kg) |
| Nova 4L | 5 × F-1 | 1 × F-1 | 4 × LH2-80k | 1 × LH2-80k | 53,000 lb (24,000 kg) |
| Nova 5S | 6 × 200 in (510 cm) Solid-propellant | 4 × 200 in (510 cm) solid motor | 6 × J-2 | 2 × J-2 | 130,000 lb (59,000 kg) |
| Nova 7S | 7 x 160 in (410 cm) Solid-propellant | 2 × M-1 | 1 × J-2 | - | 166,000 lb (75,300 kg) |
| Nova 8L | 8 × F-1 | 2 × M-1 | 1 × J-2 | - | 150,000 lb (68,000 kg) |
| Nova 8L Mod | 2 × F-1 | 2 × F-1 | 4 × J-2 | - | 110,000 lb (50,000 kg) |
| Nova 9L | 9 × F-1 | 4 × F-1 | 6 × J-2 | 2 × J-2 | 130,000 lb (59,000 kg) |

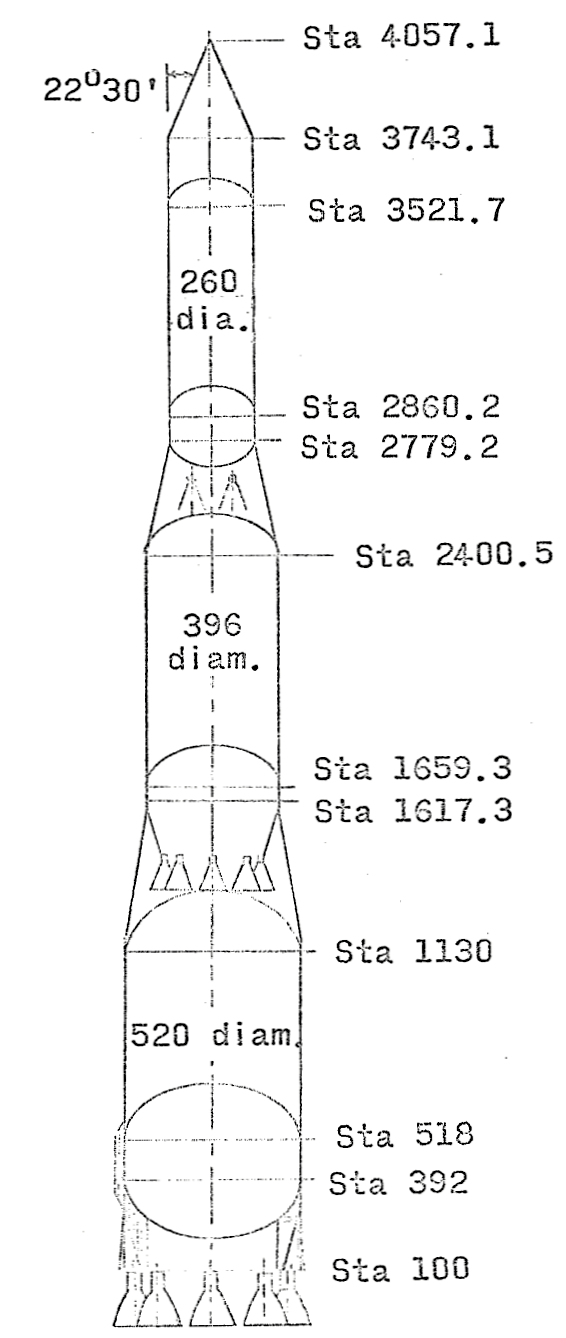
Nova design (1961)

A number of upgraded Saturns were also studied. Dr. von Braun's original Saturn design became the A-1 model, while the A-2 replaced the Titan missile with a Jupiter. The more powerful B-1 model used a cluster of Titans for its second stage, but was otherwise similar to the A-1. More "radical" proposals, those requiring new engines, were lumped together in the "C series". C-1 was similar to the A-1, but used new upper stages derived from Titan engines, while the similar C-2 used new J-2 powered upper stages. C-3 through C-5 used the same J-2 powered uppers, but added a new first stage powered by three, four, or five F-1 engines (hence the names). Dr. von Braun's favored approach remained Earth Orbit Rendezvous (EOR), but this time based on two Saturn C-3's.

The debate between the various approaches came to a head in 1961, and the outcome was unexpected by both teams. Instead of either the direct ascent or Earth orbit rendezvous, the working group instead selected a third option, Lunar Orbit Rendezvous (LOR). LOR had a mass requirement about midway between the Saturn C-3 and Nova 8L. After studying what would be required to modify either booster to the new requirement of about 200,000 pounds (91,000 kg) in low Earth orbit (LEO), it seemed that the Saturn C-5 would be the best solution. The C-2 model would also be built as a testbed system, launching subassemblies into orbit for flight testing before the C-5 would be ready. The main determinant in selecting the Saturn over the Nova was that the Saturn C-5 could be built in an existing factory outside New Orleans, later known as the Michoud Assembly Facility, while the larger diameter Nova would need new factories to be built.

Studies on the Nova series continued into 1962 as a backup for Saturn, but were eventually ended as the Saturn-based LOR profile became ingrained.

== Mars rockets ==
As the Apollo program continued, NASA designers started looking at their needs for the post-Apollo era, and it appeared that a human mission to Mars would be the next "obvious" step. For this role the Saturn V was far too small, and a second series of Nova design studies started for launchers of up to 1,296,000 pounds (588,000 kg) planned for 1977 delivered to LEO. Unlike the original Nova series which was designed by NASA, the new designs were studied under contract by the major aerospace companies that did not receive major Apollo-related contracts, namely General Dynamics and Martin Marietta. Philip Bono at Douglas Aircraft decided to send in his own unsolicited proposals as well.

All of the companies submitted a wide variety of designs. Many of these were based on existing technology, suitably enlarged. For instance, Martin's smallest design, the 1B, used fourteen F-1s in the first stage and had a LEO payload of 662,000 pounds (300,000 kg). They also suggested a number of "advanced" designs using the latest (undeveloped) technology, notably aerospike engines. The Nova C8 concept was nearly identical to the proposed "Saturn C-8"; there were differences in staging engines and in the stage-1 fin/flaring arrangement.

Post-Apollo Nova designs, circa 1963
| Design | Stage 1 | Stage 2 | LEO payload | Expected Operational date |
|---|---|---|---|---|
| Nova MM 1B | 14 × F-1A | 2 × M-1 | 730,000 lb (330,000 kg) | December 1972 |
| Nova MM 1C | 18 × F-1A | 3 × M-1 | 979,000 lb (444,000 kg) | February 1973 |
| Nova MM S10E-1 | 24 × CD module | | 1,296,000 lb (588,000 kg) | October 1977 |
| Nova MM S10E-2 | 30 × CD module | - | 1,281,000 lb (581,000 kg) | November 1977 |
| Nova MM S10R-2 | 30 × CD module | - | 842,000 lb (382,000 kg) | July 1978 |
| Nova MM S10R-1 | 24 × CD module | - | 913,000 lb (414,000 kg) | June 1978 |
| Nova MM R10E-2 | 30 × CD module | - | 1,314,000 lb (596,000 kg) | October 1980 |
| Nova MM R10R-2 | 30× CD module | - | 933,000 lb (423,000 kg) | October 1980 |
| Nova MM T10EE-1 | 18 × CD module | 2 × CD module | 1,019,000 lb (462,000 kg) | November 1976 |
| Nova MM T10RE-1 | 18 × CD module | 2 × CD module | 941,000 lb (427,000 kg) | November 1976 |
| Nova MM T10RR-2 | 24 × CD module | Toroid FD | 1,056,000 lb (479,000 kg) | December 1976 |
| Nova MM T10RR-3 | 18 × CD module | 2 × CD module | 924,000 lb (419,000 kg) | July 1977 |
| Nova MM 14A | 4 × 300 in (760 cm) solid propellant | 5 × M-1 | 1,060,000 lb (481,000 kg) | April 1973 |
| Nova MM 14B | 4 × 280 in (710 cm) solid propellant | 4 × M-1 | 822,000 lb (373,000 kg) | February 1973 |
| Nova MM 24G | 18 × HP-1 | 2 × HP-1 | 985,000 lb (447,000 kg) | December 1974 |
| Nova MM 33 | 24 × HP-1 | - | 1,041,000 lb (472,000 kg) | April 1975 |
| Nova MM 34 | 4 × L6H | 1 × L6H | 1,171,000 lb (531,000 kg) | June 1976 |
| Nova GD-B | 16 × F-1A | 5 × J-2 | 745,000 lb (338,000 kg) | |
| Nova GD-E | 4 × 325-inch solid | 4 × M-1 | 1,010,000 lb (458,000 kg) | |
| Nova GD-F | 4 × L-7.70 | 2 × M-1 | 1,001,000 lb (454,000 kg) | |
| Nova GD-H | 4 × L-5.25H | 1 × L-5.00H | 1,001,000 lb (454,000 kg) | |
| Nova DG-J | 4 × L-6.55 | 2 × M-1 | 1,001,000 lb (454,000 kg) | |

Soon after the proposals were submitted, it became clear that post-Apollo funding would be considerably less. NASA abandoned its Nova plans in 1964.

=== Specifications for Nova C8 ===
Major Nova specifications include:

| | First stage | Second stage | Third stage |
|---|---|---|---|
| Length | 160 ft (48.8 m) | 140 ft (42.7 m) | 58 ft (17.8 m) |
| Diameter | 40 ft (12.2 m) | 33 ft (10.1 m) | 22 ft (6.6 m) |
| Full mass | 7,900,000 lb (3,600,000 kg) | 1,700,000 lb (771,000 kg) | 260,000 lb (120,000 kg) |
| Empty mass | 399,900 lb (181,400 kg) | 140,000 lb (63,500 kg) | 29,340 lb (13,310 kg) |
| Number of engines | 8 x F-1 | 8 x J-2 | 1 x J-2 |
| Thrust (vac) | 13,921,000 lb (61,925 kN) | 1,858,000 lb (8,265 kN) | 232,000 lb (1,032 kN) |
| I_{sp} | 304 s (2.98 km/s) | 425 s (4.17 km/s) | 425 s (4.17 km/s) |
| Burn time | 157 s | 338 s | 473 s |
| Propellants | Lox / Kerosene | Lox / LH2 | Lox / LH2 |

== See also ==
- List of canceled launch vehicle designs
