= John Houbolt =

American aerospace engineer

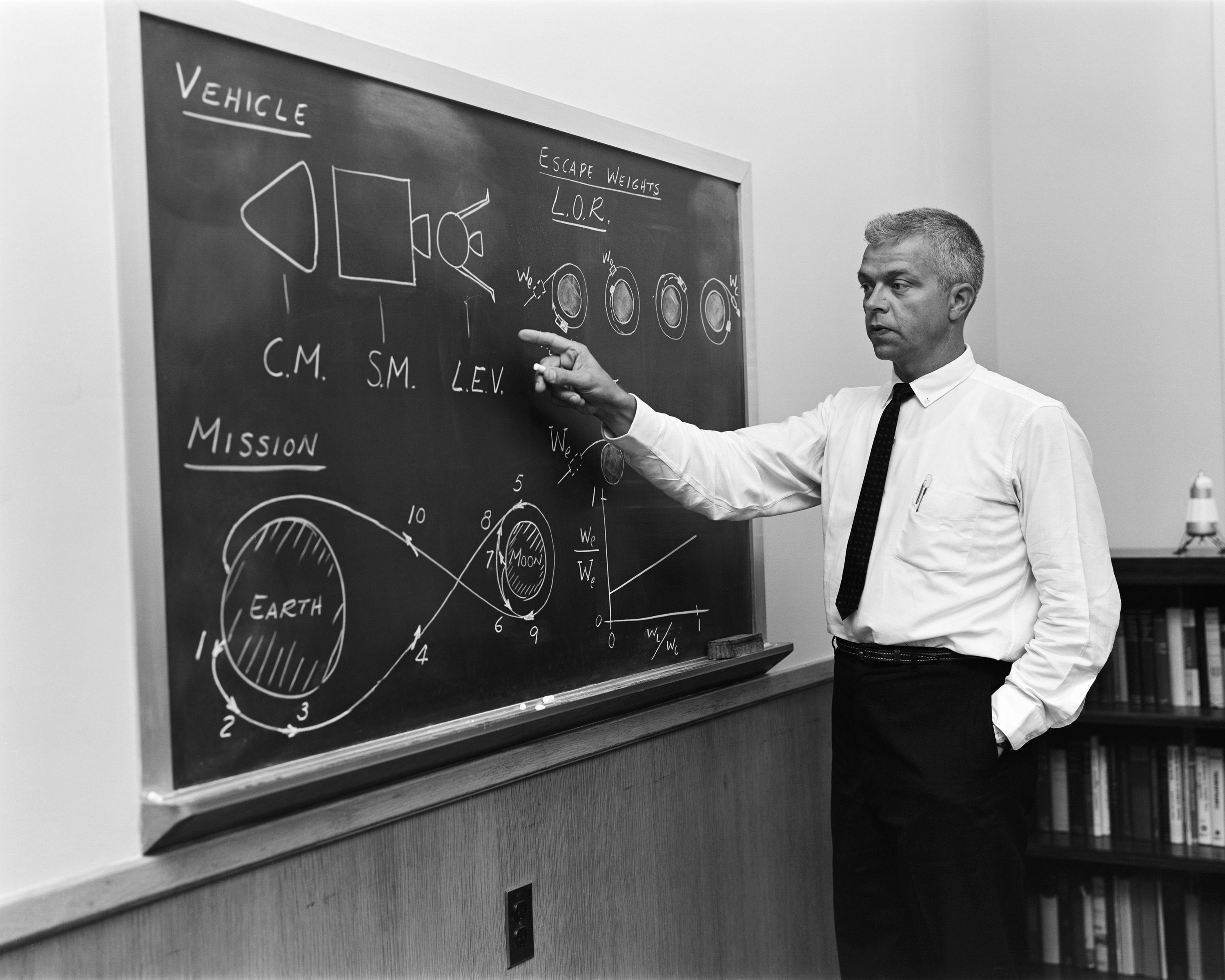
- Houbolt explains lunar orbit rendezvous
- Born: John Cornelius Houbolt; April 10, 1919; Altoona, Iowa, U.S.
- Died: April 15, 2014 (aged 95); Scarborough, Maine, U.S.
- Education: University of Illinois at Urbana–Champaign, ETH Zurich
- Spouse: Mary Morris
- Children: 3
- Awards: NASA Exceptional Scientific Achievement Medal, 1963
- Scientific career
- Fields: Aerospace engineering
- Workplaces: National Advisory Committee for Aeronautics; National Aeronautics and Space Administration; Langley Research Center

John Cornelius Houbolt (April 10, 1919 – April 15, 2014) was an aerospace engineer credited with leading the team behind the lunar orbit rendezvous (LOR) mission mode, a concept that was used to successfully land humans on the Moon and return them to Earth. This flight path was chosen for the Apollo program in July 1962. The critical decision to use LOR was viewed as vital to ensuring that man reached the Moon by the end of the decade as proposed by President John F. Kennedy. In the process, LOR saved time and billions of dollars by efficiently using the available rocket and spacecraft technologies.

== Life ==
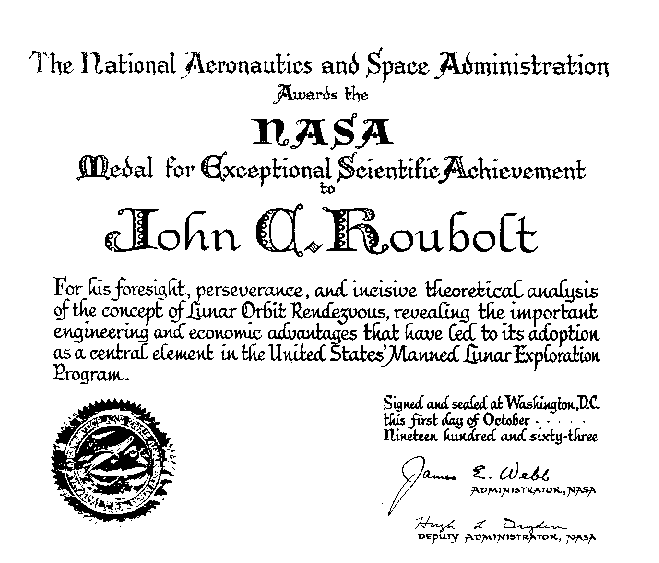
Certificate from NASA

Houbolt was born in Altoona, Iowa in 1919 to first-generation Dutch immigrant parents. He spent part of his childhood in Joliet, Illinois, where he attended Joliet Central High School and Joliet Junior College. He attended the University of Illinois at Urbana–Champaign, earning a B.S. in 1940 and an M.S. degree in 1942, both in Civil Engineering. He later received a Ph.D. degree in Technical Sciences in 1957 from ETH Zurich. Houbolt began his career at the National Advisory Committee for Aeronautics in 1942, and stayed on at NASA after it succeeded NACA. From 1963 to 1976, he worked for a consulting firm, Aeronautics Research Associates, then returned to NASA until retirement in 1985.

Houbolt was an engineer at the Langley Research Center in Hampton, Virginia, and he was one of the most vocal of a minority of engineers who supported LOR in a campaign that lasted from 1960 to 1962. Once this mode was chosen in 1962, many other aspects of the mission were significantly based on this fundamental design decision. He was a guest at Mission control for the Apollo 11 lunar landing.

He was awarded the NASA Exceptional Scientific Achievement Medal in 1963. He was a member of the National Academy of Engineering. He was awarded an honorary doctorate, awarded on May 15, 2005, at the University of Illinois at Urbana-Champaign, and his papers were deposited in the University of Illinois Archives. In 2009, the Illinois House of Representatives adopted HR 540 in his honor. He is additionally commemorated in the city of Joliet: The street fronting Joliet Junior College, which he attended, was renamed Houbolt Road; a mural in Joliet Union Station includes a Lunar Module, in reference to his work for NASA; and a wing of the Joliet Area Historical Museum became a permanent exhibit to celebrate his achievements.

He lived in Williamsburg, Virginia. In later years he lived in Scarborough, Maine. He died at a nursing home there in 2014 of Parkinson's disease.

In the 1998 HBO miniseries From the Earth to the Moon, Houbolt was played by Reed Birney.

== Lunar orbit rendezvous (LOR) ==
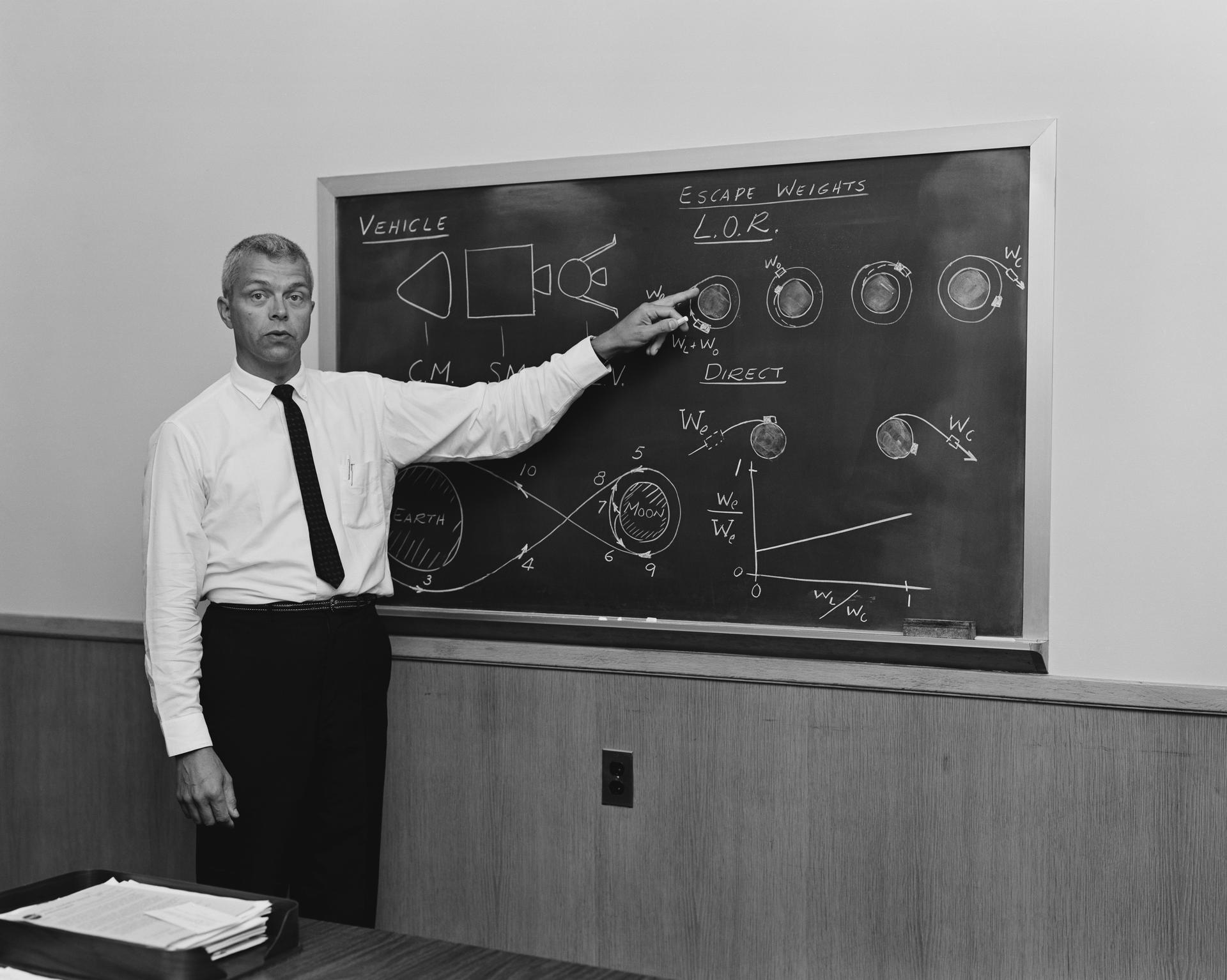
LOR explained by Houbolt

Although the basics of the lunar orbit rendezvous (LOR) concept had been expressed as early as 1916 by Yuri Kondratyuk and 1923 by German rocket pioneer Hermann Oberth, NASA would provide the first practical application of the concept. Some engineers were concerned about the risks of space rendezvous, especially in lunar orbit, where there would be no fallback options in case of a major mishap.

After Houbolt presented the LOR concept to a series of dismissive high-level panels, he ignored the chain of command and complained in a long letter dated November 15, 1961, to Associate Administrator of NASA Robert Seamans that his proposal had been derided as "a scheme that has a 50 percent chance of getting a man to the moon and a 1 percent of getting him back." Indeed, at one of the earliest NASA panels on December 14, 1960, Houbolt was attacked in the presence of both Seamans and Wernher von Braun by fellow engineer Max Faget, who announced, "His figures lie. He doesn't know what he's talking about." However, the detailed letter to Seamans, together with studies of the difficulties posed by the need for a massive rocket in a direct ascent and the problems associated with landing a large craft on the lunar surface following an Earth orbit rendezvous, led Seamans and von Braun to support LOR in 1962.

While some aspects of Houbolt's initial estimates were off (such as a 10,000 lb (4,500 kg) Apollo Lunar Module which was ultimately 32,399 lb (14,696 kg), his LOR package proved to be feasible with a single Saturn V rocket whereas other modes would have required two or more such rocket launches or a rocket much heavier than the Saturn V to lift enough mass into space to complete the mission.

== Space Shuttle tiles ==
Leading up to the first mission of the Space Shuttle, STS-1, in 1981 Houboult co-wrote a letter with structural engineer Holt Ashley to Chris Kraft, director of Johnson Space Center, imploring him to delay the launch believing the orbiter would suffer major loss of thermal protection tiles, and potentially lose the vehicle.

Of particular concern was a strut attaching the nose of the orbiter to the External Tank. Langley Research Center urged further wind tunnel testing, which Kraft reluctantly agreed to do. While the tiles had been an ongoing concern since the original development of the Shuttle, the teams involved believed it was safe to fly by that point.

Upon jettisoning, the External Tank did show heat damage around the forward strut area, as feared. On reaching orbit some tiles were visibly missing around the tail of the Shuttle, and fears that the more-critical tiles on the underside of the vehicle were damaged led to a hastily arranged effort to use KH-11 KENNEN spy satellites and the Kuiper Airborne Observatory to acquire imaging of the Shuttle in orbit to assess the damage. Fortunately, the damage was minimal, and the mission concluded safely.

Damaged leading edge thermal protection panels on the left wing, with a similar but more stringent heat protection job, caused the Space Shuttle Columbia disaster in 2003.

== Quotes ==
- "Somewhat as a voice in the wilderness, I would like to pass on a few thoughts." (In a 1961 letter to Robert Seamans, NASA associate administrator.)
- "Do we want to go to the moon or not?" (in the same letter)
- "Thank you, John." — Wernher von Braun to Houbolt upon the successful landing of Apollo 11, a remark captured on a NASA film taken at Mission Control in Houston. If Houbolt had not pushed the LOR concept—risking his NASA career and professional reputation—it would have been unlikely that the first successful lunar landing and return mission could have been accomplished by President Kennedy's 1969 completion date. Von Braun recognized this and personally invited Houbolt to the control center for the event.
