= Apollo spacecraft feasibility study =

Various NASA plans for a successor to Project Mercury

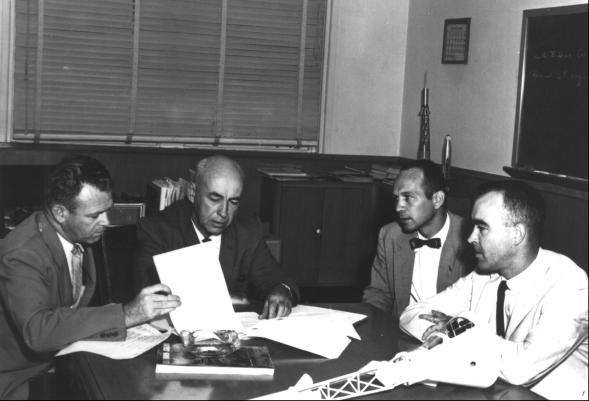
Robert R. Gilruth (second from left), Director of NASA's Space Task Group, and chief assistants Charles Donlan left), Maxime Faget, and Robert Piland in August 1960 discuss selection of contractors to study feasibility of a crewed circumlunar mission

The Apollo spacecraft feasibility study was conducted by NASA from July 1960 through May 1961 to investigate preliminary designs for a post-Project Mercury multi-crewed spacecraft to be used for possible space station, circum-lunar, lunar orbital, or crewed lunar landing missions. Six-month, $250,000 study contracts were awarded to General Dynamics/Convair, General Electric, and the Glenn L. Martin Company. Meanwhile, NASA conducted its own inhouse design study led by Maxime Faget, intended as a gauge of the competitors' entries. The three companies spent varying amounts of their own money in excess of the $250,000 to produce designs which included a re-entry module separate from the mission module cabin, and a propulsion and equipment module.

One week after the presentation of the contractors' designs, President John F. Kennedy committed NASA to a crewed lunar landing, giving the Apollo program an immediate, critical focus. NASA decided to discard the study designs and the mission module cabin, and based the lunar landing mission design on Faget's inhouse design, with a cone-shaped command module, supported by a cylindrical service module containing return propulsion and supporting equipment. This would be carried to the lunar surface by a still-to-be-defined landing propulsion module. NASA then launched another competition for the command/service module procurement contract.

In December 1961, GE publicly presented their feasibility study design to the American Astronautical Society. Similarities in the basic mission-command-propulsion module design have been noted to the Soviet Union's Soyuz spacecraft designed by Sergei Korolev and Vasily Mishin. It has been speculated that Korolev and Mishin could have incorporated GE design elements in the existing OKB-1 Sever designs (1959-1962) that eventually became the cancelled Soyuz-A (7K) (1963) and approved Soyuz 7K-OK (1965-1967).

== Background ==
In July and August 1960, NASA's Space Task Group (STG) hosted a series of NASA-industry conferences to discuss post-Project Mercury crewed spacecraft plans. Deputy Administrator Hugh L. Dryden announced at the conference opening that "the next spacecraft beyond Mercury will be called Apollo."

On August 30, NASA presented plans to award three feasibility study contracts for the Apollo spacecraft, conceived as a three-man Earth orbital and circumlunar craft, with growth potential for crewed lunar landings. A Request For Proposal was issued on September 12, and fourteen bids were received by October 9. On October 25, NASA awarded the $250,000, six-month contracts to General Dynamics/Convair, General Electric, and the Glenn L. Martin Company. Meanwhile, members of the Space Task Group performed their own spacecraft design studies, to serve as a gauge to judge and monitor the three industry designs.

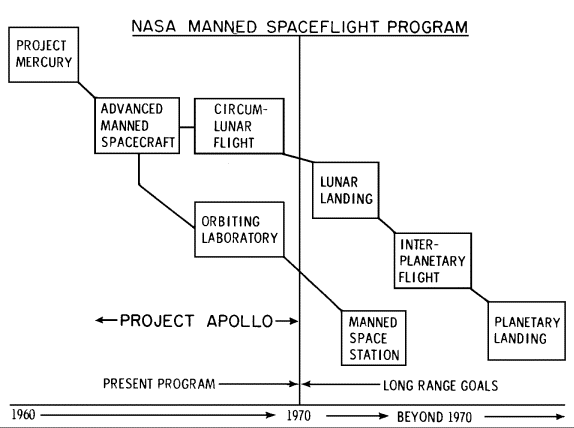
An early Apollo Program plan, involving a proposal like the Project Olympus for an Earth orbital laboratory station.

All three competitors supplemented the $250,000 contracts with their own money: Convair spent $1 million, GE $2 million, and Martin $3 million. The Manager of GE Space Vehicle Systems (Philadelphia), George Arthur, led the GE proposal team that included Harold Bloom, Charles Bixler, Jacob Abel, and Arnold Cohen. On May 15 to 17, 1961, the contractors presented their study results to NASA. All three designs employed a mission module cabin separate from the command module (piloting and re-entry cabin), and a propulsion and equipment module. Martin studied three different reentry module shapes, including a conical capsule vehicle similar to the STG configuration. GE also studied several reentry module shapes. GD/Convair's proposal employed a lifting body shape.

== Designs ==
=== GD/Convair ===
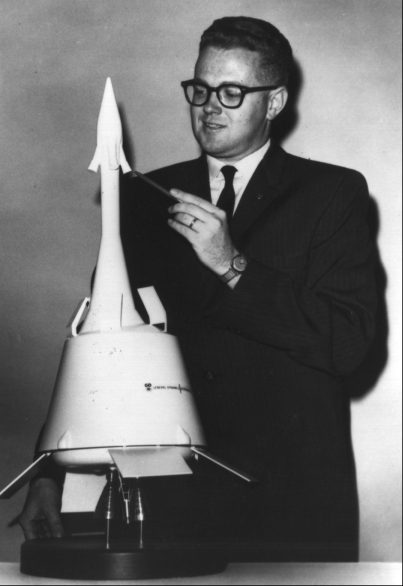
Model of General Dynamics Corporation's proposed Apollo circumlunar mission design

Convair/Astronautics' entry was designed primarily for lunar orbit, with flexibility and growth potential built in to accommodate lunar landing. The company estimated a total program cost of $1.25 billion over about six years.

Convair selected a lifting body for the return vehicle (command module), similar to one conceived several years earlier by Alfred J. Eggers of NASA-Ames. This had an abort tower attached through launch, and nestled inside a large mission module. Convair/Astronautics envisioned a progressive flight development plan, with many Earth-orbital missions before attempting circumlunar, and then lunar-orbital missions. Earth landings would be by glidesail parachute near San Antonio, Texas. The development flights would experiment with space rendezvous, docking, artificial gravity, and maneuverable landing, leading to an eventual lunar landing. The study cost the contractor about $1 million.

=== GE D-2 ===
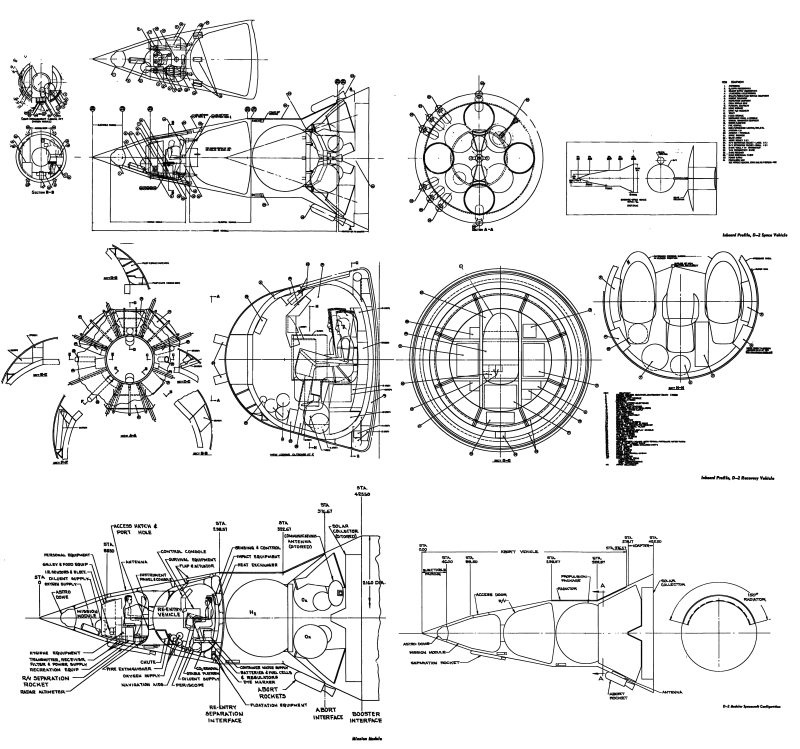
Cross section of the GE D-2 submission, showing complete spacecraft and descent module

GE's design capitalized upon hardware almost ready to fly: a bullet-shaped descent module, carried between a conical mission module cabin containing life support and avionics, and the cylindrical propulsion module. The entire craft was 33.4 feet (10.2 m) long, with one innovation: a cocoonlike wrapping for secondary pressure protection in case of cabin leaks or meteoroid puncture. Had this configuration been selected, the payload sent to the Moon would have resembled the nose cone flown on the early Saturn I rockets. Although GE did not estimate the final costs in its summary, the company was confident of achieving circumlunar flight by the end of 1966 and lunar-orbital flight shortly thereafter.

Seeking professional recognition for their design work on the GE proposal, George Arthur and Jacob Abel publicly presented their papers documenting the GE D-2 design in December 1961 at a special symposium of the American Astronautical Society in Denver, Colorado.

=== Martin ===
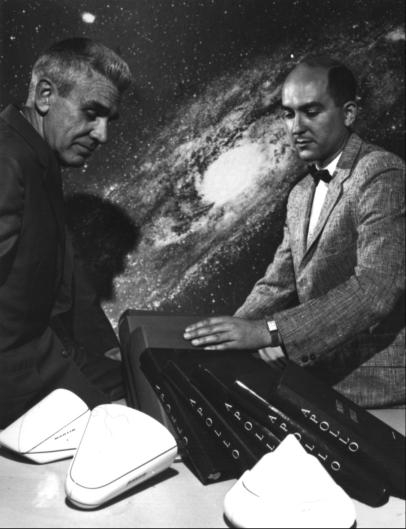
Employees of the Martin Company display models of their top three command module designs, and proposal materials

The Martin Company spent about $3 million, employing almost 300 persons for the better part of the six-month term, to produce the most elaborate study of the three, not only following all the Space Task Group guidelines, but also going far beyond in systems analysis. The complete proposal consisted of 9,000 pages. Focusing on versatility, flexibility, safety margins, and growth, this was the only study that detailed the progression of steps from lunar orbiting to lunar landing. Martin's spacecraft would have been similar to the Apollo spacecraft that ultimately emerged. When Martin later entered the Apollo hardware procurement contract competition, NASA scored them highest of all the entrants on configuration design.

Martin recommended a five-part spacecraft. The command module was a flat-bottomed cone with a rounded apex and a tower for a tractor-rocket launch escape system. Behind the flat aft bulkhead were propulsion, equipment, and mission modules. Tradeoffs between weight and propulsion requirements led to the selection of a pressurized shell of semimonocoque aluminum alloy coated with a composite heatshield of superalloy with a charring ablator. Two crewmen would sit abreast, with the third behind, in couches that could rotate for reentry g-load protection and for getting in and out of the spacecraft. Flaps for limited maneuverability on reentry, a parachute landing system, and a jettisonable mission module that could also serve as a solar storm cellar, a laboratory, or even the descent stage for a lunar lander, were also featured.

== Spacecraft procurement competition ==
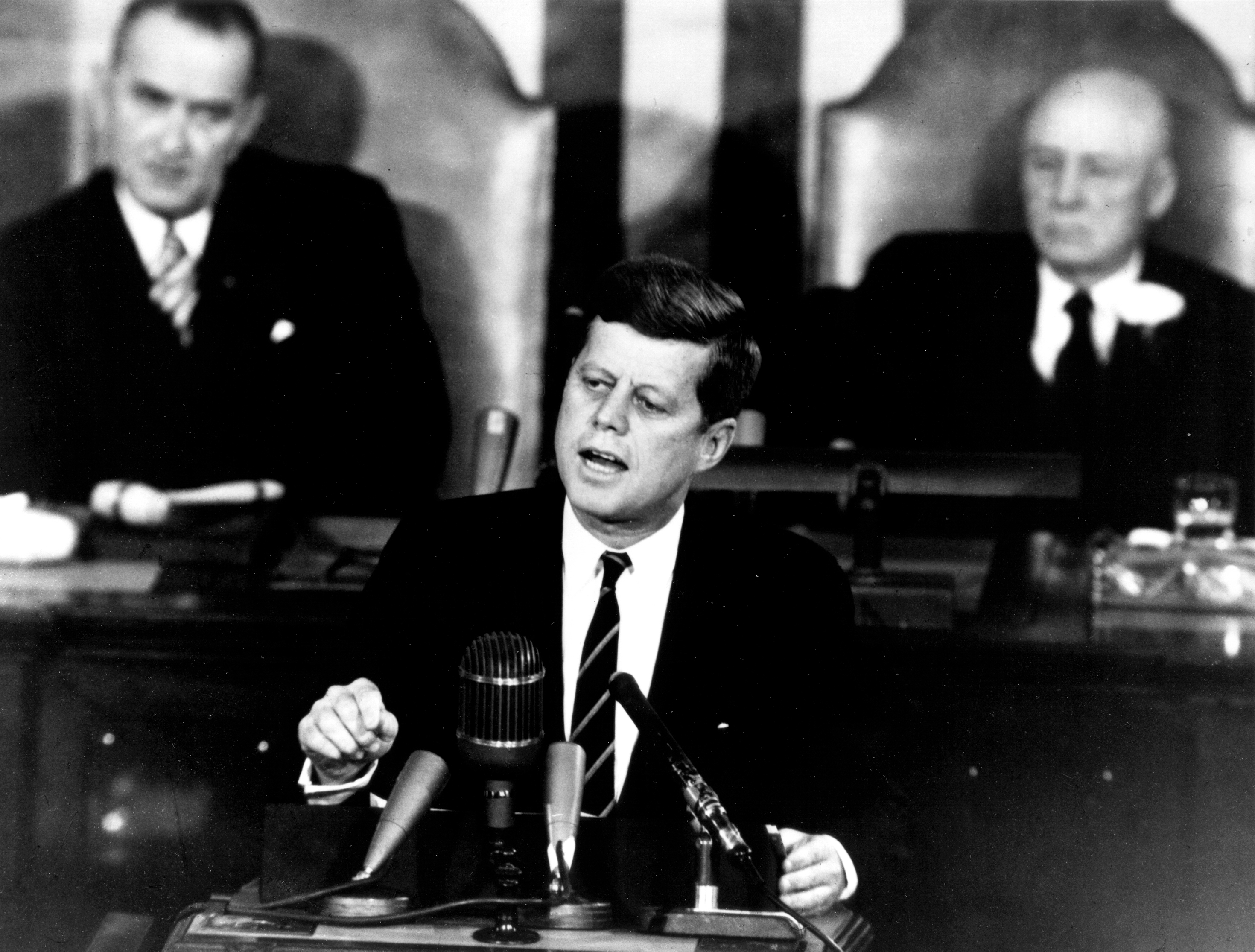
President Kennedy proposes a crewed lunar landing program to Congress

NASA did not get a chance to deliberate long on the study results, due to the pressure placed on America's space program by the Soviet's launching of the first man in space, Yuri Gagarin, on April 12, 1961. On May 25, one week after presentation of the study results, President John F. Kennedy proposed the Moon landing objective to the US Congress, giving the Apollo program a clear focus and sense of urgency. NASA turned its focus to what relevant data could be mined from the proposals (abandoning the mission module), and launched another competition for the hardware procurement phase, fixing the reentry module configuration to the conical shape designed by Maxime Faget.

NASA awarded the contract for the Apollo Command/Service Module (CSM) to North American Aviation on November 28, 1961, when it was still assumed the lunar landing would be achieved by direct descent or Earth orbit rendezvous rather than by lunar orbit rendezvous. Therefore, design proceeded without a means of docking the Command Module to a lunar lander spacecraft. In the summer of 1962, the selection of the LOR proposal from NASA's Langley Research Center, plus several technical obstacles encountered in some subsystems (such as environmental control), soon made it clear that substantial redesign would be required. By 1963, NASA decided the most efficient way to keep the Apollo program on track and address technical obstacles encountered in some subsystems such as environmental control, was to proceed with the development of two CSM versions: the preliminary Block I, and the advanced Block II.

== Similarity to Soyuz ==
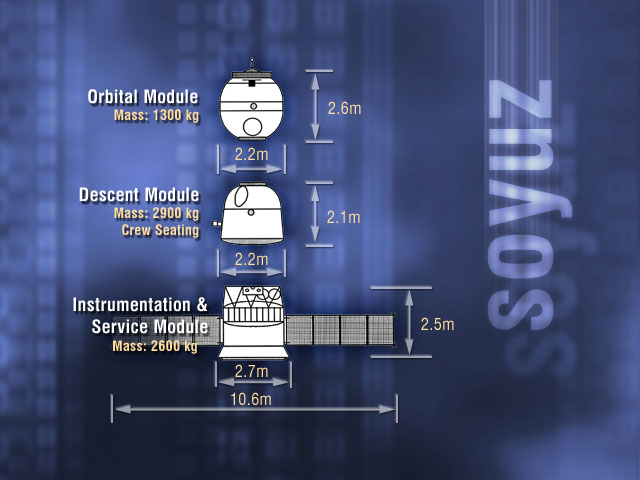
The Soyuz TMA spacecraft uses a separate orbital (mission) module in front of a descent module shaped similarly to that of the GE D-2.

Similarities have been noted between the GE D2 design and the Russian Soyuz spacecraft, which was designed and built after George Arthur and Jacob Abel's AAS presentation (Denver, CO) in December 1961. In particular, Soyuz uses an orbital module located in front of the descent module, which uses a similar sphere-cone-sphere shape.

Victor Minenko, one of the OKB-1 designers with Korolev in 1950s and 1960s, who was active with RSC Energia in 1993, noted that in 1961 there were 40 people in several departments working on early designs and versions of the eventual Soyuz. "We use to read carefully the U.S. literature by the leading astrodynamicists - Ferri, Chapman, Van Driest, Lees, and the top Russians - Sibulkin, Koropkin". Vassily Mishin, chief Soyuz designer after Korolev's death, noted that a logical comparison of the Soyuz was to the US Apollo command/service module, since both were designed for lunar transport.

In 1983, Phillip S. Clark and Ralph F. Gibbons discussed the Russian Soyuz program development (1963-1967) and adaptation of design elements from other programs and studies (Soviet and foreign).

A similar modular design was used in the Russian Progress spacecraft (essentially the uncrewed version of Soyuz), the Chinese Shenzhou spacecraft, and the planned Indian ISRO Orbital Vehicle.

== See also ==
- Apollo Command/Service Module
- Apollo program
- Soyuz (spacecraft)
- Soyuz 7K-TM
- Progress (spacecraft)
- Shenzhou (spacecraft)
