= Space Launching System =

1960s-era design program of the US Air Force

The Space Launching System, or Space Launcher System, (SLS), was a 1960s-era design program of the US Air Force for a family of launch vehicles based around a set of common components. After a series of studies in the late 1950s, the Air Force had concluded that the maximum efficiency would be gained by using only liquid hydrogen fuel for upper stages, which demanded the use of boosters based on segmented solid fuel rockets. By combining one of three upper stages with three different diameters of solids built to any length needed, the SLS provided wide flexibility in launch capability.

The SLS was one of two programs being designed at different divisions within the Air Force, with the ultimate aim of providing the launch services for the X-20 Dyna Soar crewed spaceplane. Its competition was an upgraded version of the Titan I with a new upper stage that produced the Titan C concept. In the end, neither SLS or Titan C would be developed, in its place the new Titan III was selected, combining the new missile of the Titan C with the solid boosters of the SLS.

The SLS was also needed for the Lunex Project, a proposed human lunar landing in 1967.

The replacing Titan III was more formally known as Program 624A (SSLS), Standard Space Launch System, Standardized Space Launch System, Standardized Space Launching System or Standard Space Launching System.

== See also ==
- List of space launch system designs
- Aerojet M-1
- Lunex Project
