= Lunex Project =

US Air Force manned Moon base plan

- Moon

Site information
- Type: Underground Air Force base
- Controlled by: United States

Site history
- Built: Planned to begin after 1967
- In use: Project canceled

Garrison information
- Garrison: 21 USAF personnel

The Lunex Project was a US Air Force 1958 plan for a crewed lunar landing prior to the Apollo Program. The final lunar expedition plan in 1961 was for a 21-person underground Air Force base on the Moon by 1968 at a total cost of $7.5 billion. The primary distinction between the later Apollo missions and Lunex was the orbital rendezvous maneuver. The Lunex vehicle, composed of a landing module and a lifting body return/re-entry module, would land the entire vehicle and all astronauts on the surface, whereas the final Apollo mission involved a separate ascent module leaving the command module and service module connected in lunar orbit with a single astronaut. The original plan for Apollo was for direct ascent, similar to Lunex.

== Design details ==
=== Associated vehicles (estimates) ===
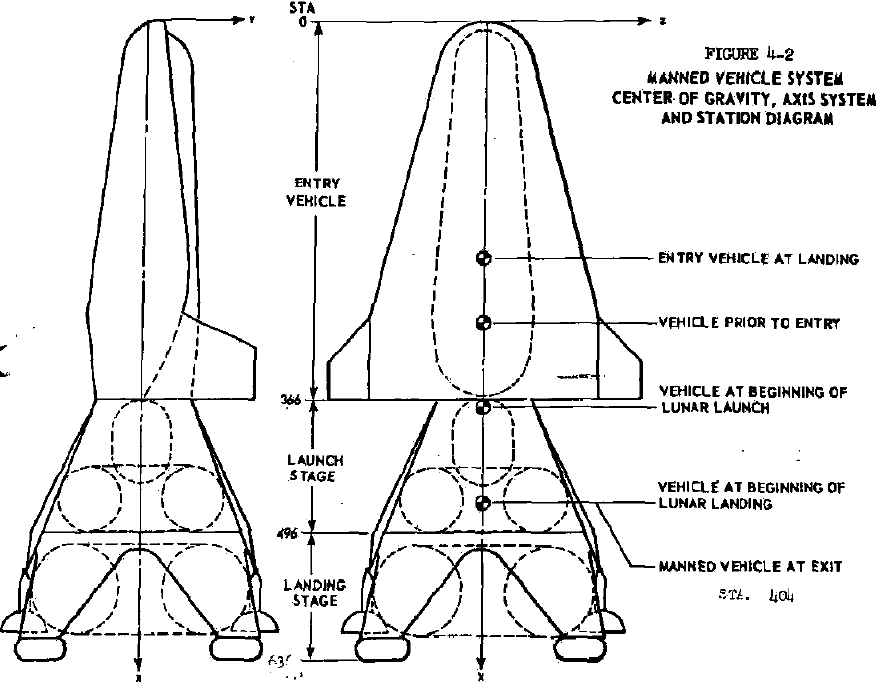
Lunex spacecraft concept

Lunex Lunar Lander

- Crew Size: 3
- Length: 16.16 m (53.01 ft)
- Maximum Diameter: 7.62 m (24.99 ft)
- Span: 7.62 m (24.99 ft)
- Mass: 61 000 kg (134 000 lb)
- Agency: USAF

=== Location ===
Selection of base sites were to be made by automated probes, with Kepler crater being a studied location.

== Background ==
Lunex planned to make its first lunar landing and return in 1967, in order to beat the Soviets and demonstrate conclusively that America could win future international competition in technology with the USSR. The Air Force felt that no achievement short of a lunar landing would have the required historical significance.

The use of the direct ascent profile was considered to be the most promising because it eliminated some of the complexities of the lunar orbit rendezvous that would later be used by Apollo: in particular there would be no need to develop rendezvous techniques in space. The down side was that the Lunex spacecraft would be much heavier than Apollo to carry the extra fuel required to land the entire spacecraft on the Moon and return it to lunar orbit, and consequently a larger rocket would be required to send it to the Moon.

=== Major "Prestige" milestones ===
Date	Milestone
April 1965	First Manned Orbital Flight (3 Man Space Vehicle)
July 1966	First Lunar landing (Cargo)
September 1966	Manned Circumlunar Flight
August 1967	Manned lunar landing and Return
January 1968	Permanently Manned Lunar Expedition

=== Problems ===
The main problems to be solved were:

- Re-entry at 11,000 m/s (37,000 ft/s), with the flight path within a two-degree angle to avoid overheating or skipping out of the Earth's atmosphere. The latter would not kill the crew directly, but would leave the Earth-return spacecraft in an elliptical orbit where they might be exposed to excessive radiation in the Van Allen belts before the next re-entry opportunity.
- Development of the lunar landing stage, which would have to make a precision landing tail-first on rocket thrust: something never previously tested.
- Development of the lunar launching stage, which had no backup capability, so must be extremely reliable and capable of automated checkout on the lunar surface, and capable of putting the crew into the correct orbit to return to Earth.

== See also ==
- Moonbase
- Project Horizon
- Colonization of the Moon
- Project A119
- Space Launching System
- Zvezda (moonbase)
