= Lunar orbit rendezvous =

Spaceflight maneuver

Diagram of LOR

Lunar orbit rendezvous (LOR) is a process for landing humans on the Moon and returning them to Earth. It was utilized for the Apollo program missions in the 1960s and 1970s. In a LOR mission, a main spacecraft and a lunar lander travel to lunar orbit. The lunar lander then independently descends to the surface of the Moon, while the main spacecraft remains in lunar orbit. After completion of the mission there, the lander returns to lunar orbit to rendezvous and re-dock with the main spacecraft, then is discarded after transfer of crew and payload. Only the main spacecraft returns to Earth.

Lunar orbit rendezvous was first proposed in 1919 by Ukrainian engineer Yuri Kondratyuk, as the most economical way of sending a human on a round-trip journey to the Moon.

The most famous example involved Project Apollo's command and service module (CSM) and lunar module (LM), where they were both sent to a translunar flight in a single rocket stack. However, variants where the landers and main spacecraft travel separately, such as the lunar landing plans proposed for Shuttle-Derived Heavy Lift Launch Vehicle, Golden Spike and the 2029/2030 Chinese crewed effort, are also considered to be lunar orbit rendezvous.

== Advantages and disadvantages ==
=== Advantages ===
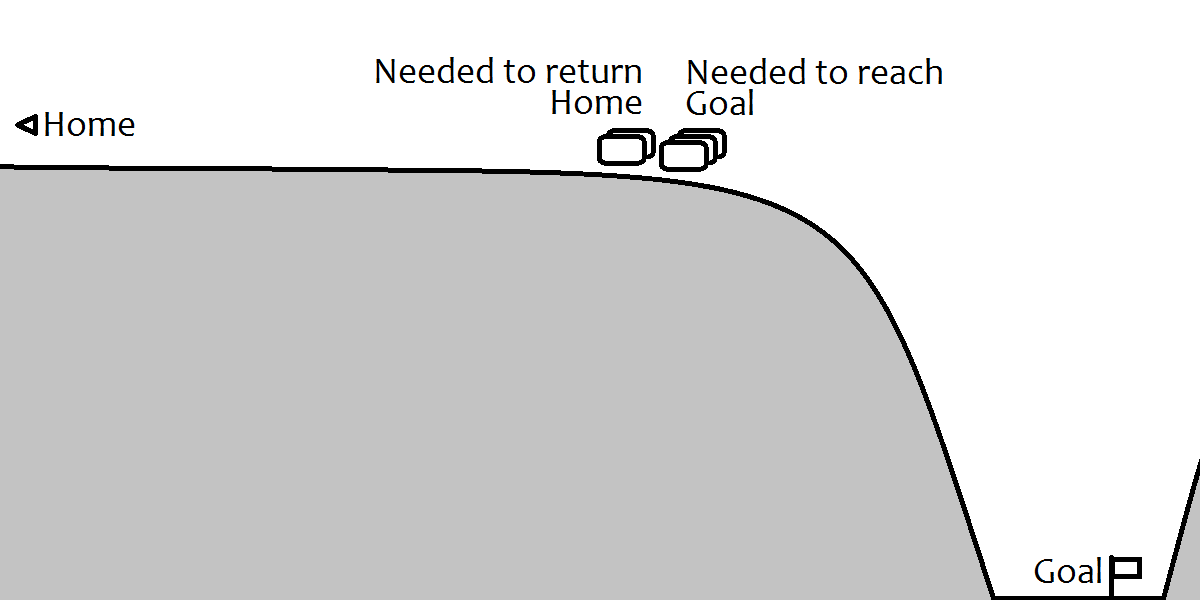
Representation of the lunar gravity well, illustrating how resources needed only for the trip home don't have to be carried down and back up the "well"

The main advantage of LOR is the spacecraft payload saving, due to the fact that the propellant necessary to return from lunar orbit back to Earth need not be carried as dead weight down to the Moon and back into lunar orbit. This has a multiplicative effect, because each pound of "dead weight" propellant used later has to be propelled by more propellant sooner, and also because increased propellant requires increased tankage weight. The resultant weight increase would also require more thrust for lunar landing, which means larger and heavier engines.

Another advantage is that the lunar lander can be designed for just that purpose, rather than requiring the main spacecraft to also be made suitable for a lunar landing. Finally, the second set of life support systems that the lunar lander requires can serve as a backup for the systems in the main spacecraft; this redundancy saved the crew of Apollo 13 when their command module's systems failed.

=== Disadvantage ===
Lunar-orbit rendezvous was considered risky in 1962, because space rendezvous had not been achieved, even in Earth orbit. If the LM could not reach the CSM, two astronauts would be stranded with no way to get back to Earth or survive re-entry into the atmosphere. Rendezvous was successfully demonstrated in 1965 and 1966 on six Project Gemini missions (Note: Gemini 6A, Gemini 8, Gemini 9A, Gemini 10, Gemini 11, and Gemini 12) with the aid of radar and on-board computers. It was also successfully done each of the eight times it was tried on Apollo missions. (Note: Apollo 9 in Earth orbit; in lunar orbit on Apollo 10, Apollo 11, Apollo 12, Apollo 14, Apollo 15, Apollo 16, and Apollo 17.)

== Apollo mission mode selection ==
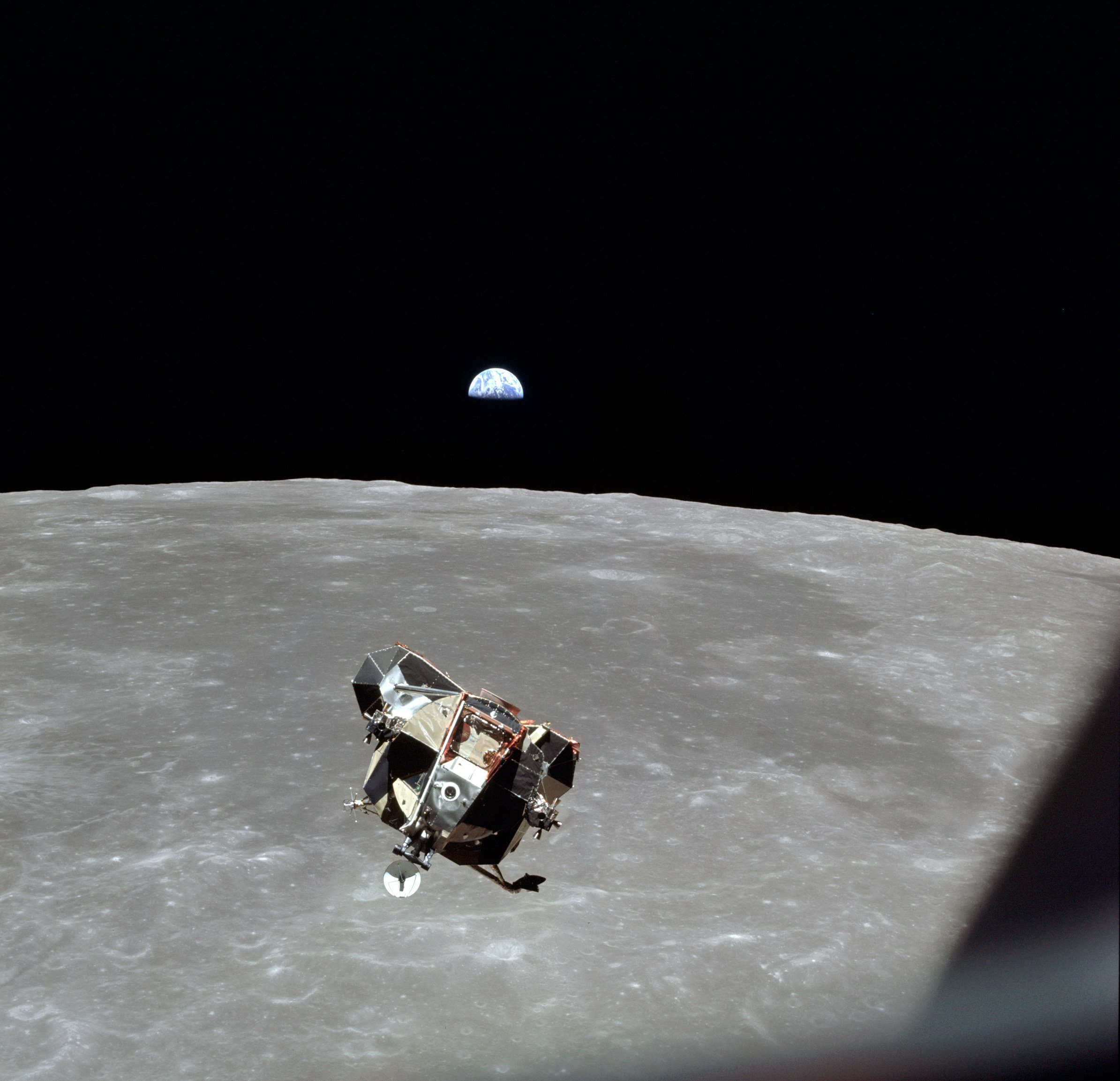
Apollo 11 Lunar Module Eagle rendezvousing with Command module Columbia in lunar orbit

When the Apollo Moon landing program was started in 1961, it was assumed that the three-man command and service module combination (CSM) would be used for takeoff from the lunar surface, and return to Earth. It would therefore have to be landed on the Moon by a larger rocket stage with landing gear legs, resulting in a very large spacecraft (in excess of 100,000 pounds (45,000 kg)) to be sent to the Moon.

If this were done by direct ascent (on a single launch vehicle), the rocket required would have to be extremely large, in the Nova class. The alternative to this would have been Earth orbit rendezvous, in which two or more rockets in the Saturn class would launch parts of the complete spacecraft, which would rendezvous in Earth orbit before departing for the Moon. This would possibly include a separately launched Earth departure stage, or require on-orbit refueling of the empty departure stage.

Wernher von Braun and Heinz-Hermann Koelle of the Army Ballistic Missile Agency presented lunar orbit rendezvous, as an option for reaching the Moon efficiently, to the heads of NASA, including Abe Silverstein, in December 1958. During 1959 Conrad Lau of the Chance-Vought Astronautics Division supervised a complete mission plan using lunar orbit rendezvous which was then sent to Silverstein at NASA in January 1960. Tom Dolan, who worked for Lau, was sent to explain the company's proposal to NASA engineers and management in February 1960. This alternative was then studied and promoted by Jim Chamberlin and Owen Maynard at the Space Task Group in the 1960 early Apollo feasibility studies. This mode allowed a single Saturn V to launch the CSM to the Moon with a smaller Lunar Excursion Module (LEM). (Note: This was shortened to "Lunar Module" (LM) in June 1966.) When the combined spacecraft reaches lunar orbit, one of the three astronauts remains with the CSM, while the other two enter the LEM, undock and descend to the surface of the Moon. They then use the ascent stage of the LEM to rejoin the CSM in lunar orbit, then discard the LEM and use the CSM for the return to Earth. This method was brought to the attention of NASA Associate Administrator Robert Seamans by Langley Research Center engineer John C. Houbolt, who led a team to develop it.

Besides requiring less payload, the ability to use a lunar lander designed just for that purpose was another advantage of the LOR approach. The LEM's design gave the astronauts a clear view of their landing site through observation windows approximately 4.6 metres (15 ft) above the surface, as opposed to being on their backs in a Command Module lander, at least 40 or 50 feet (12 or 15 m) above the surface, able to see it only through a television screen.

Developing the LEM as a second crewed vehicle provided the further advantage of redundant critical systems (electrical power, life support, and propulsion), which enabled it to be used as a "lifeboat" to keep the astronauts alive and get them home safely in the event of a critical CSM system failure. This was envisioned as a contingency, but not made a part of the LEM specifications. As it turned out, this capability proved invaluable in 1970, saving the lives of the Apollo 13 astronauts when an oxygen tank explosion disabled the Service Module.

=== Advocacy ===
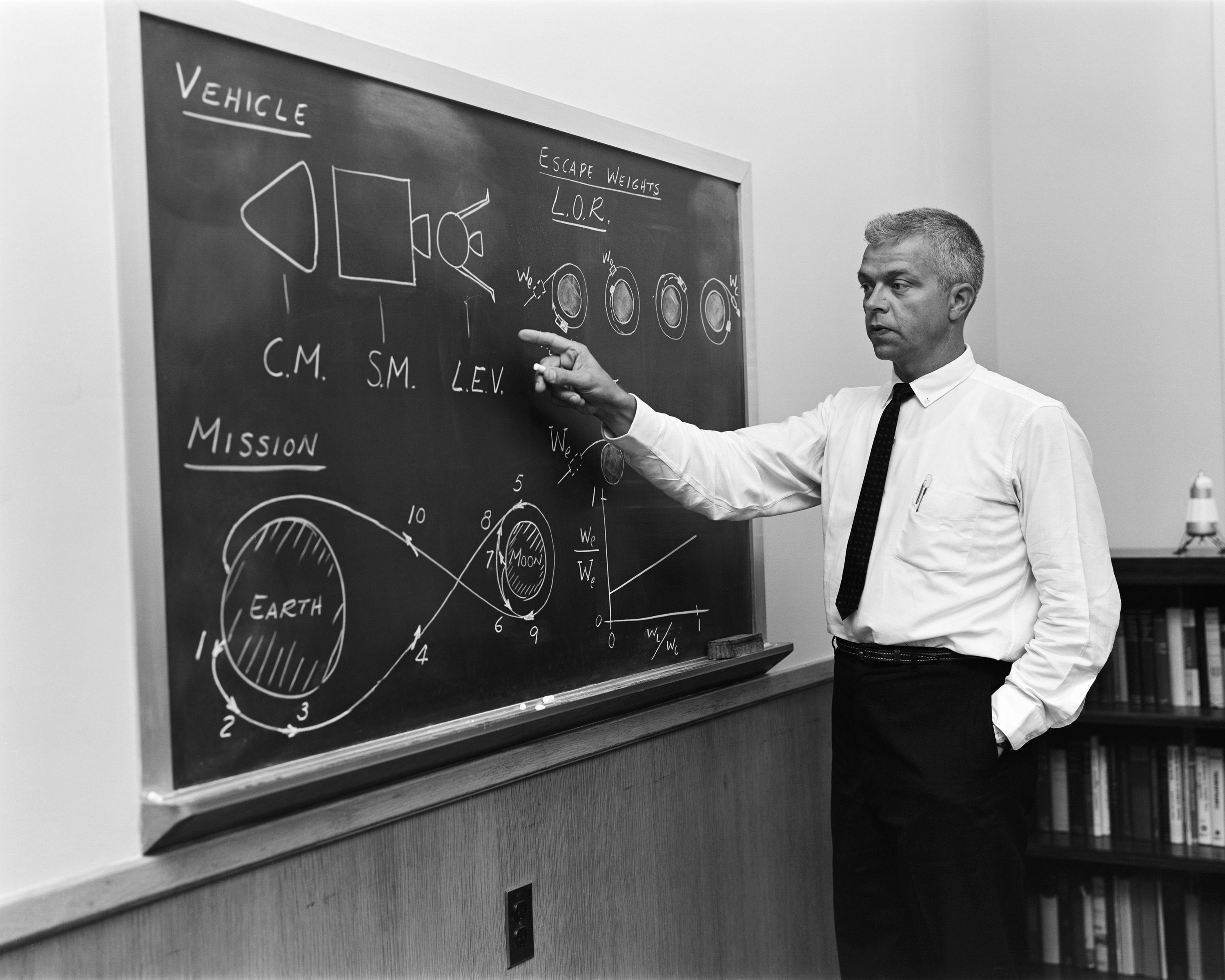
John Houbolt explains Lunar orbit rendezvous

Dr. John Houbolt would not let the advantages of LOR be ignored. As a member of Lunar Mission Steering Group, Houbolt had been studying various technical aspects of space rendezvous since 1959 and was convinced, like several others at Langley Research Center, that LOR was not only the most feasible way to make it to the Moon before the decade was out, it was the only way. He had reported his findings to NASA on various occasions but felt strongly that the internal task forces (to which he made presentations) were following arbitrarily established "ground rules." According to Houbolt, these ground rules were constraining NASA's thinking about the lunar mission—and causing LOR to be ruled out before it was fairly considered.

In November 1961, Houbolt took the bold step of skipping proper channels and writing a nine-page private letter directly to associate administrator Robert C. Seamans. "Somewhat as a voice in the wilderness," Houbolt protested LOR's exclusion. "Do we want to go to the Moon or not?" the Langley engineer asked. "Why is Nova, with its ponderous size simply just accepted, and why is a much less grandiose scheme involving rendezvous ostracized or put on the defensive? I fully realize that contacting you in this manner is somewhat unorthodox," Houbolt admitted, "but the issues at stake are crucial enough to us all that an unusual course is warranted."

It took two weeks for Seamans to reply to Houbolt's letter. The associate administrator agreed that "it would be extremely harmful to our organization and to the country if our qualified staff were unduly limited by restrictive guidelines." He assured Houbolt that NASA would in the future be paying more attention to LOR than it had up to this time.

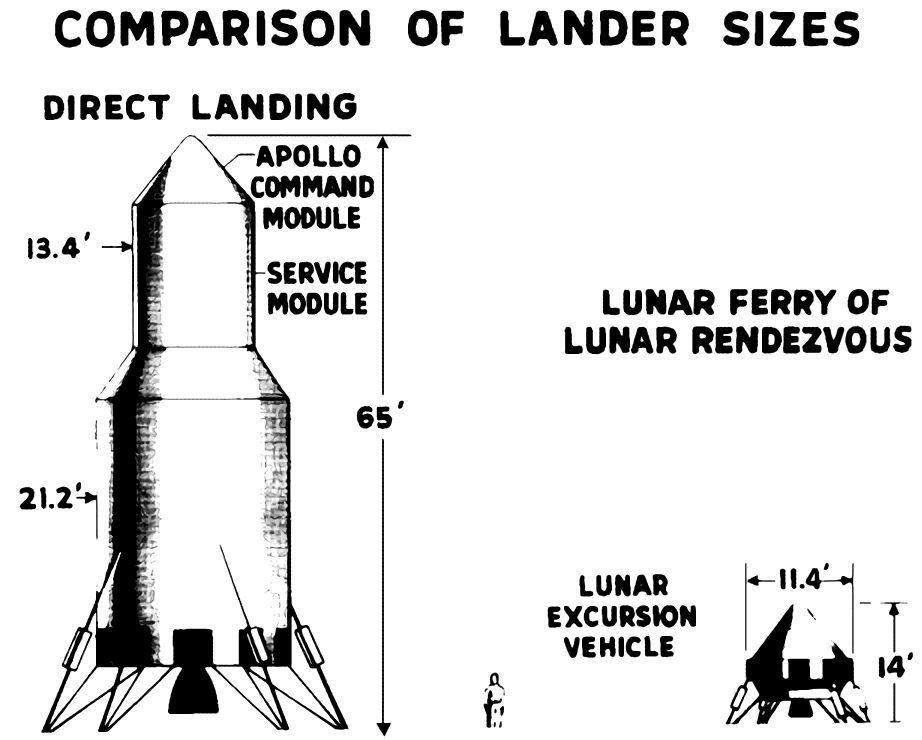
Comparison of lunar lander sizes, from an early Langley study

In the following months, NASA did just that, and to the surprise of many both inside and outside the agency, LOR quickly became the front runner. Several factors decided the issue in its favor. First, there was growing disenchantment with the idea of direct ascent due to the time and money it was going to take to develop a 50-foot (15 m) diameter Nova rocket, compared to the 33-foot (10 m) diameter Saturn V. Second, there was increasing technical apprehension over how the relatively large spacecraft demanded by Earth-orbit rendezvous would be able to maneuver to a soft landing on the Moon. As one NASA engineer who changed his mind explained:

The business of eyeballing that thing down to the Moon really didn't have a satisfactory answer. The best thing about LOR was that it allowed us to build a separate vehicle for landing.

The first major group to change its opinion in favor of LOR was Robert Gilruth's Space Task Group, which was still located at Langley but was soon to move to Houston as the Manned Spacecraft Center. The second to come over was Wernher von Braun's team at the Marshall Space Flight Center in Huntsville, Alabama. These two powerful groups, along with the engineers who had originally developed the plan at Langley, persuaded key officials at NASA Headquarters, notably Administrator James Webb, who had been holding out for direct ascent, that LOR was the only way to land on the Moon by 1969. Webb approved LOR in July 1962. The decision was officially announced at a press conference on July 11, 1962. President Kennedy's science adviser, Jerome Wiesner, remained firmly opposed to LOR.

== Other plans using LOR ==
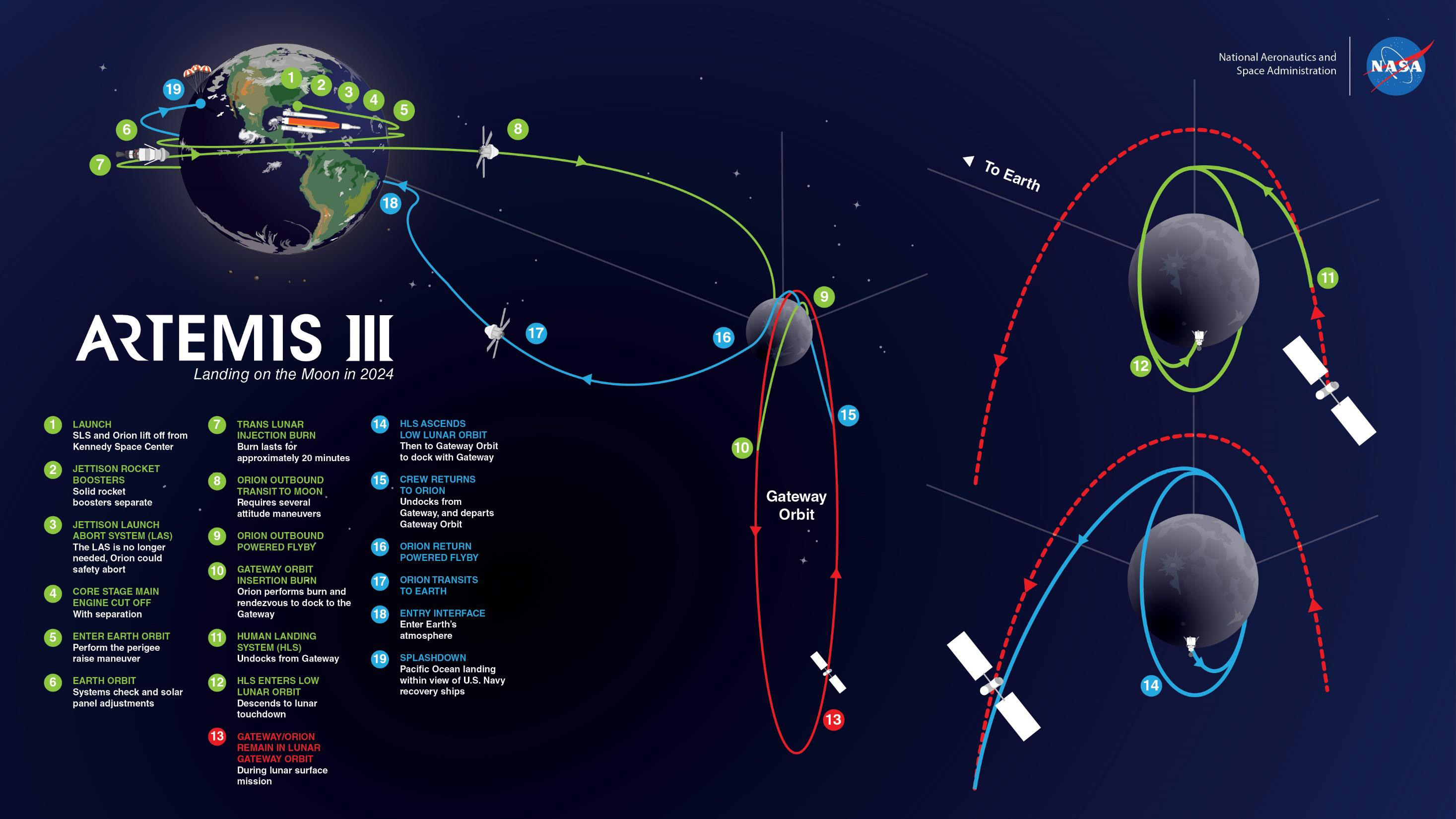
An early planned trajectory of Artemis III, which has since changed to a 2027 Low Earth orbit mission, illustrates the use of LOR

- The proposed Soviet lunar landing plan, using the N1 rocket, LK Lander and Soyuz 7K-LOK, would have used a similar LOR mission profile.
- The Constellation program would have used a combination of Earth Orbit Rendezvous and LOR for Moon landing.
- The Artemis program plans to use rendezvous in an NRHO near the Moon to land humans on the lunar south pole region.
- The Chinese Lunar Exploration Program has described a lunar landing mission using LOR.

== In popular culture ==
Episode 5 of the 1998 television miniseries From the Earth to the Moon, "Spider", dramatizes John Houbolt's first attempt to convince NASA to adopt LOR for the Apollo Program in 1961, and traces the development of the LM up to its first crewed test flight, Apollo 9, in 1969. The episode is named after the Apollo 9 Lunar Module.

== See also ==
- Lunar orbit insertion
- Trans-lunar injection
- Trans-Earth injection
