= Scimitar antenna =

Apollo spacecraft VHF radio antenna

A scimitar antenna is a radio antenna so named because its shape resembles a talon-shaped curved sword of the same name. It was invented in 1958 by Edwin M. and William P. Turner. It is essentially a flat metal plate in a semi-circular or semi-elliptical shape with a wide end at one side and a narrow point at the other. Its shape makes it suited for use on aircraft or space vehicles. It was used for VHF communication on the Apollo command and service module.

A U.S. patent was applied for on October 31, 1958, and granted on December 26, 1961. The inventors assigned the patent to the U.S. government, as represented by the Secretary of the Air Force.

== Use in Apollo Program ==
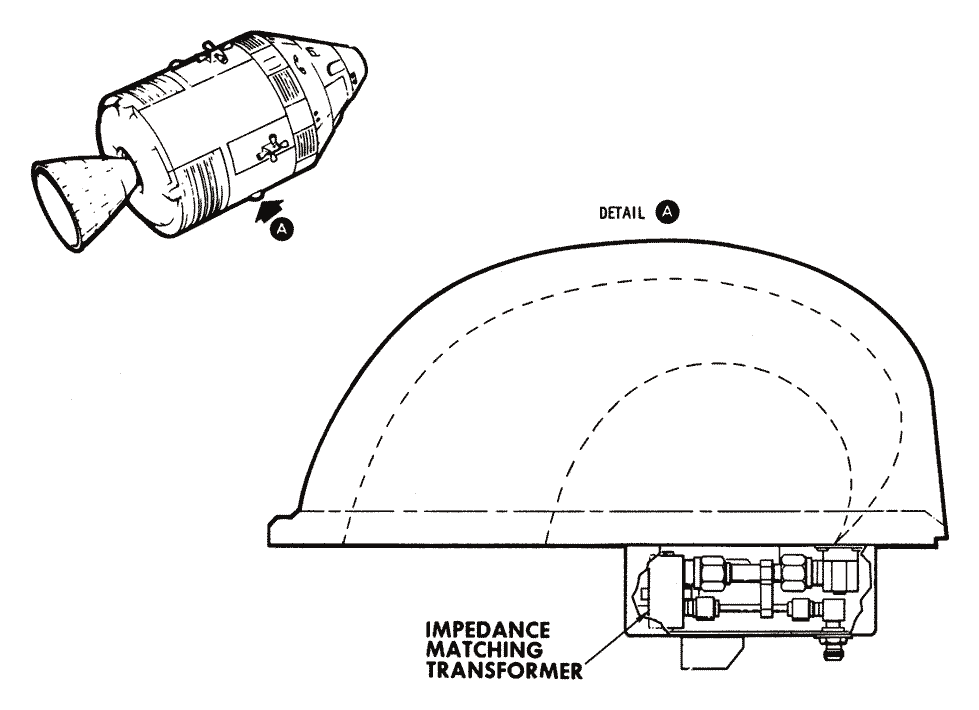
Apollo Command/Service Module scimitar antenna

The Block II Apollo command and service module carried a pair of elliptical VHF scimitar antennas on the Service Module walls. The antenna's scimitar shape wasn't externally visible, since it had to be covered by a shroud for aerodynamic purposes. The antenna radiated and received signals in an approximately hemispherical pattern, therefore two antennas were necessary to provide full omnidirectional coverage. VHF communication was used for ship-to-ground communication in Earth orbit, and ship-to-ship communication with the Apollo Lunar Module. This was distinct from the unified S-band high-gain antenna used for communication with Earth at lunar distances.

The earlier Block I design of the Apollo spacecraft carried the scimitar antennas inside two semicircular strakes attached near the base of the Command Module, which were intended to improve aerodynamic stability during reentry. However, the strakes were found to be unnecessary, and would have been ineffective at high lunar return reentry speeds. Therefore, the strakes were deleted and the antennas were moved to the Service Module in the Block II design used in crewed missions.

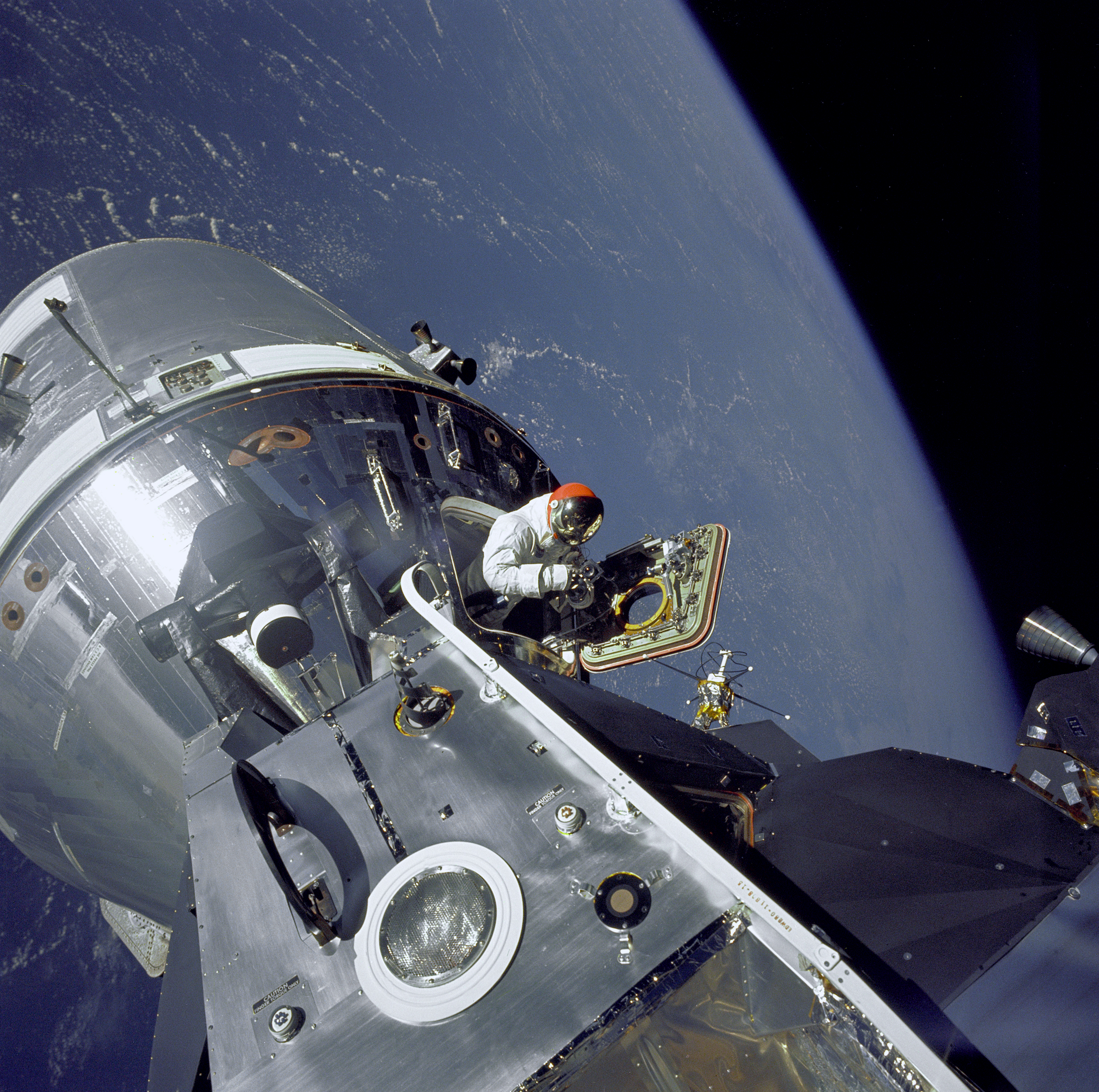
Apollo 9 LM with forward scimitar antenna visible in the left foreground.

The first two Lunar Modules to fly, Apollo 5 and Apollo 9, also carried a pair of VHF scimitar antennas for the transmission of Developmental Flight Instrumentation (DFI) telemetry data. One was located on the front face, just inboard of the right-hand side cockpit window, and the other was located on the left side of the aft equipment bay. Since the Lunar Module never operated in the Earth's atmosphere, no aerodynamic covering was necessary, and the scimitar shape was externally visible. After Apollo 9, the Lunar Module was considered operational, so the DFI and scimitar antennas were not present on subsequent flights.

== VHF jamming ==
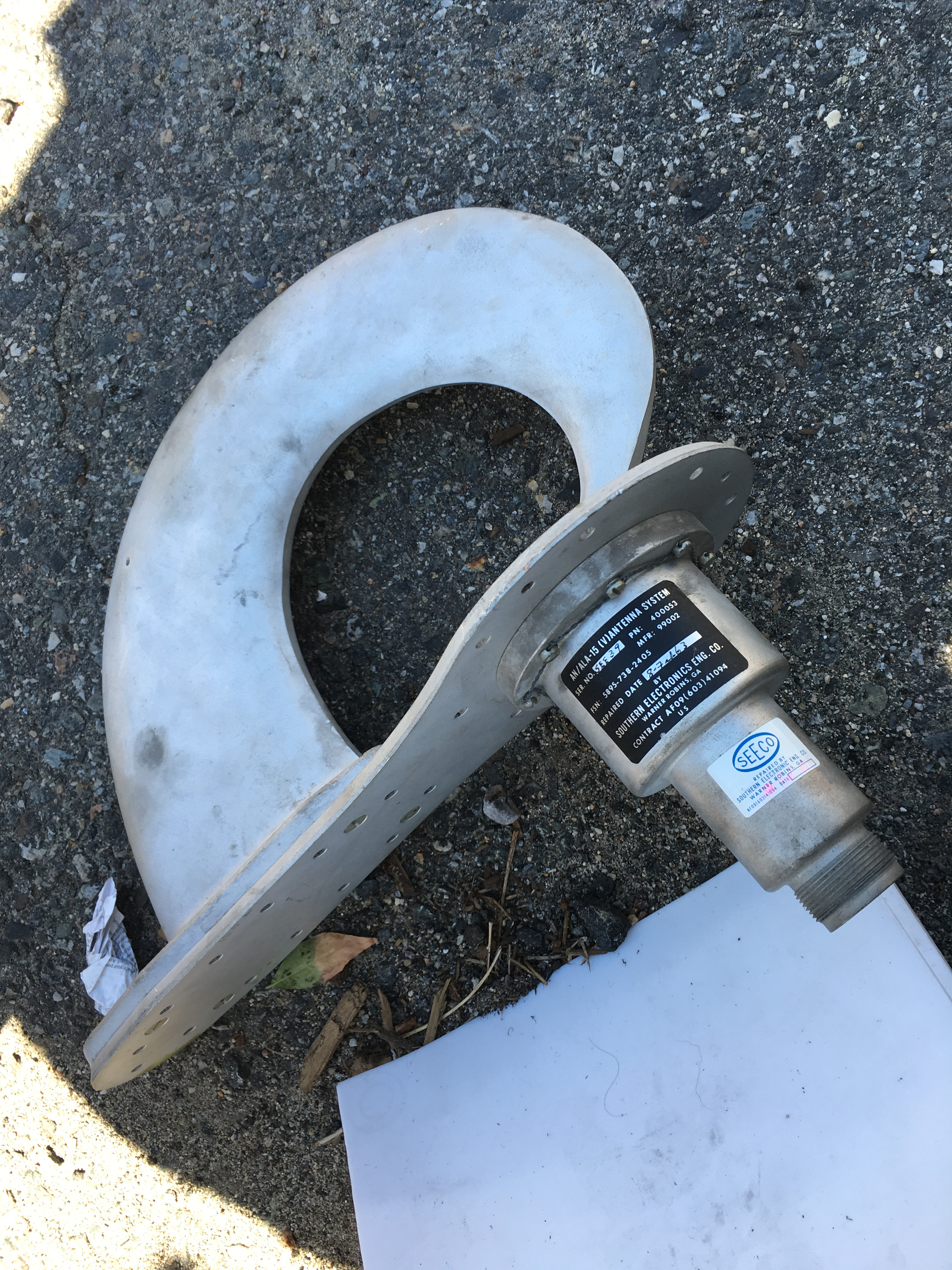
Antenna for the AN/ALA-15(V) jammer of a B-52

Military aircraft, typically long-range bombers in the 1960s, sometimes used VHF jamming to disrupt the voice communications of interceptor aircraft. This jamming required broadband, omnidirectional antennas, such as the scimitar.

Difficulties in developing the WCLG-3B design of antenna for the AN/ALA-15(V) voice jammer, by Dynalectron Corporation, led to both patented techniques in precision-forming PTFE as dielectric components, and also a notable lawsuit over the termination of the US Government contract to supply them.
