= Unified S-band =

Tracking and communication system developed by NASA and JPL

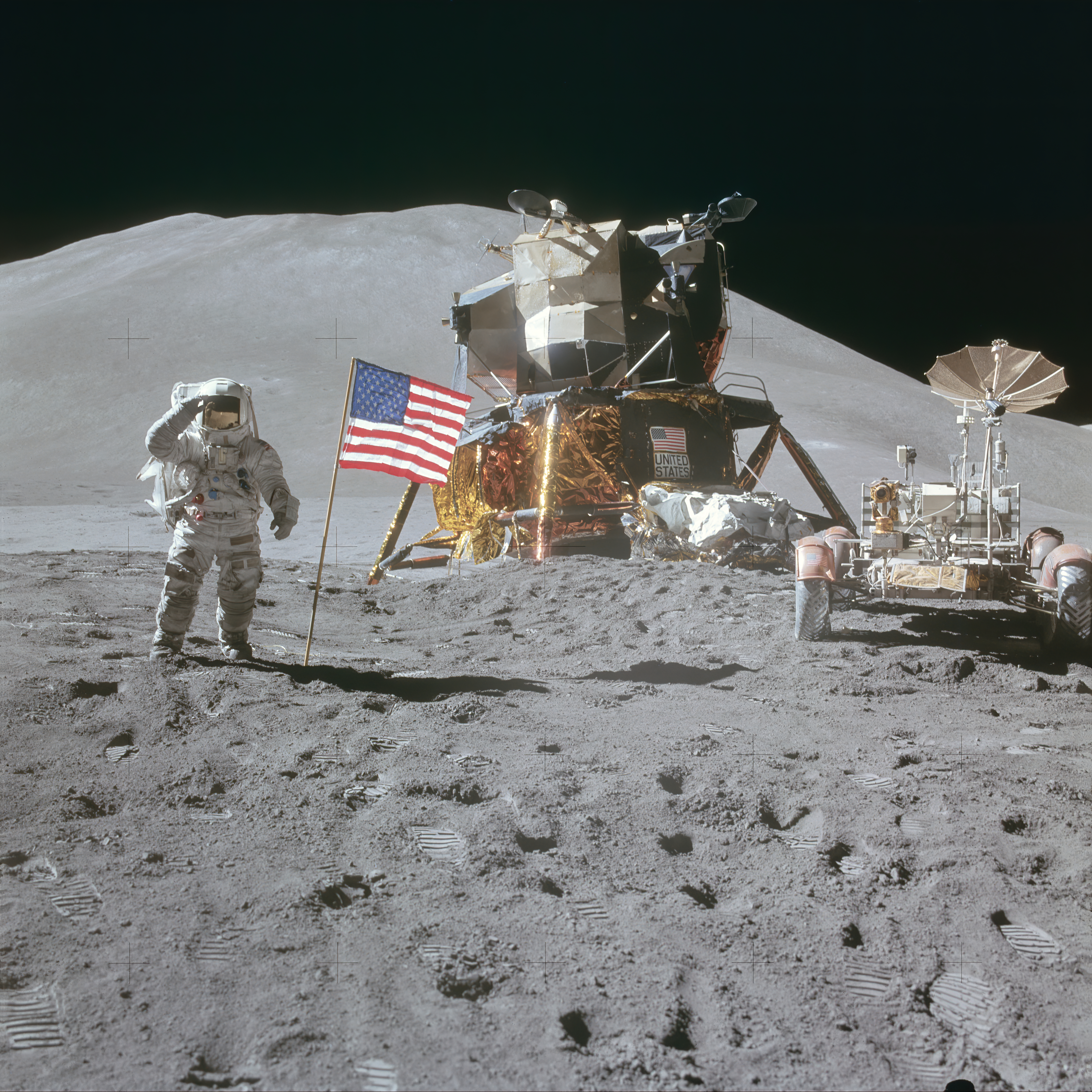
Apollo 15 Lunar Module and Lunar Roving Vehicle, August 1, 1971. The S-band dish antenna for the rover is visible.

The Unified S-band (USB) system is a tracking and communication system developed for the Apollo program by NASA and the Jet Propulsion Laboratory (JPL). It operated in the S band portion of the microwave spectrum, unifying voice communications, television, telemetry, command, tracking and ranging into a single system to save size and weight and simplify operations. The USB ground network was managed by the Goddard Space Flight Center (GSFC). Commercial contractors included Collins Radio, Blaw-Knox, Motorola and Energy Systems.

== Basis ==
The previous programs, Mercury and Gemini, had separate radio systems for voice, telemetry, and tracking. Uplink voice and command, and downlink voice and telemetry data were sent via ultra high frequency (UHF) and very high frequency (VHF) systems. The tracking capability was a C band beacon interrogated by a ground-based radar. With the much greater distance of Apollo, passive ranging was not feasible, so a new active ranging system was required. Apollo also planned to use television transmissions, which were not supported by the existing systems. Finally, the use of three different frequencies complicated the spacecraft systems and ground support. The Unified S-band (USB) system was developed to address these concerns.

The USB system did not completely replace all other radio transmitters on Apollo. Apollo still used VHF between astronauts and the Lunar Module (LM) and Lunar Roving Vehicle during extra-vehicular activity; between the lander and the command module, and between the spacecraft and Earth stations in the orbital and recovery phases. As a backup the CM could measure range to the LM over the VHF voice link. The spacecraft radar systems operated on frequencies separate from those of the USB.

== Development ==
The S-Band communications and ranging system was developed by the MIT Lincoln Laboratory in Lexington, Massachusetts, under task A of the Lincoln Laboratory Apollo contract. The design approach was the development of an alternative integrated communication system functionally compatible with the spacecraft design.

The concept was presented by Lincoln Laboratory in an initial report on July 16, 1962 titled Interim Report on Development of an Internal On-Board RF Communications System for the Apollo Spacecraft. In this report, it was shown that many on-board electronic functions could be performed very effectively by a single system that was a suitable adaptation of the transponder developed by Jet Propulsion Laboratory for use with the DSIF tracking stations. This was the origin of the Goal System for Apollo, later called the Integrated (or Integral) RF system, then later known as the Unified Carrier System. The idea behind the unified S-Band communications system was to reduce the number of systems previously used in the Mercury space program, which provided a multiplicity of electromagnetic transmitting and receiving equipment. In early flights, these operated at seven discrete frequencies within five widely separated frequency bands. Largely because of expediency, the following separate units were employed:

- HF voice transmitter and receiver
- UHF voice transmitter and receiver
- Command receiver
- Telemetry transmitter No. 1
- Telemetry transmitter No. 2
- C-band transponder beacon
- S-band transponder beacon

Ground facilities matching this capsule equipment were included in many of the Mercury network stations.

When the Apollo project was initiated, NASA stipulated that as much as possible of the existing Mercury ground network equipment should be utilized. In addition, the spacecraft was to include a transponder compatible with the Deep Space Instrumentation Facility (DSIF) ground stations established by the Jet Propulsion Laboratory. This transponder would be used for the communications and tracking in cis-lunar space between earth and the moon.

In the preliminary research of the Unified S-Band, North American Aviation, Inc., (the company that developed Apollo's command and service modules) indicated the following four pieces of equipment would be installed in Apollo for ground-to-spacecraft use:

- DSIF transponder (S-band) (for cis-lunar distances) for transmission of TV, voice, telemetry data, and ranging signals
- VHF FM transmitter (for near-Earth distances) for transmission of telemetry data
- VHF AM transceiver (for near-Earth distances) for transmission and reception of voice and guidance of rescue aircraft
- C-band transponder (for near-Earth distances) for radar tracking

The DSIF transponder had a basic capability to perform the functions of the VHF FM transmitter, the VHF AM transceiver, and the C-band transponder at near-earth distances. Significant features of the transponder and its ground equipment were all-coherent, phase-locked operation and the use of a pseudo-random (noiselike) binary code for unambiguous range measurements at long distances. The choice of optimum modulation methods and waveforms for the upward and downward RF links was a key factor in the adaptation of the unified carrier system to Apollo requirements.

Additional electronic apparatus was to be deployed for rendezvous guidance, for lunar (and Earth) altimetry, and for lunar landing control. The requirements for this additional equipment had not been firmly established when Lincoln Laboratory began its research. From experience with the Mercury space program, it was apparent to Lincoln Laboratory that considerable on-board simplification would result if a single integrated communications and tracking system were used in Apollo instead of the four systems listed above.

=== Unified S-Band demonstration ===
Early in 1962, a small group of Lincoln Laboratory staff members was asked to provide a demonstration of the Unified Carrier concept to NASA by December 31, 1962. The demonstration was aimed at providing experimental evidence that the unified carrier concept was feasible. Since manpower was limited, it was decided to concentrate on the space-vehicle-to-Earth link, the critical link in the system. The demonstration was available by December 17, 1962. The demonstration was held on January 17, 1963 for NASA (Manned Space Center and Headquarters) and North American Aviation, Inc.

The demonstration of the unified carrier concept for the space vehicle-to-Earth link was limited to transmitting a ranging code and wideband telemetry signal on a 47.5-mc carrier by hard wire via a noisy and attenuating medium. The simulated ground receiver used a phase-locked loop. The carrier reference generated by the VCO of the carrier phased-locked loop was used to heterodyne the received signal to video, a process of synchronous demodulation. A correlation method was used to process the transmitted and received codes for ranging. The demonstration simulated the Doppler effect and signal-to-noise ratio expected for an Apollo mission. The phase-locked loops in the receiver acquired the transmitted carrier, telemetry subcarrier, and code clock components almost instantaneously for the signal-to-noise ratios predicted to exist at maximum Apollo range and for a radial space-vehicle velocity of 36,000 ft/sec. Range code correlation generally took only a few seconds.

In the beginning, it was suggested that the DSIF transponder could be modified and augmented so as to be used for lunar altimetry and rendezvous ranging. However, as increased emphasis was placed on lunar landing and lunar orbital rendezvous techniques, it became apparent that specialized radar and optical equipment would be preferable for those applications. Accordingly, most of the effort at M.I.T Lincoln Laboratory was directed toward the communication and tracking link between the Apollo spacecraft and earth.

== Technical summary ==
From a NASA technical summary:

The design of the USB system is based on a coherent doppler and the pseudo-random range system which has been developed by JPL. The S-band system utilizes the same techniques as the existing systems, with the major changes being the inclusion of the voice and data channels.

A single carrier frequency is utilized in each direction for the transmission of all tracking and communications data between the spacecraft and ground. The voice and update data are modulated onto subcarriers and then combined with the ranging data [...]. This composite information is used to phase-modulate the transmitted carrier frequency. The received and transmitted carrier frequencies are coherently related. This allows measurements of the carrier doppler frequency by the ground station for determination of the radial velocity of the spacecraft.

In the transponder the subcarriers are extracted from the RF carrier and detected to produce the voice and command information. The binary ranging signals, modulated directly onto the carrier, are detected by the wide-band phase detector and translated to a video signal.

The voice and telemetry data to be transmitted from the spacecraft are modulated onto subcarriers, combined with the video ranging signals, and used to phase-modulate the downlink carrier frequency. The transponder transmitter can also be frequency modulated for the transmission of television information or recorded data instead of ranging signals.

The basic USB system has the ability to provide tracking and communications data for two spacecraft simultaneously, provided they are within the beamwidth of the single antenna. The primary mode of tracking and communications is through the use of the PM mode of operation. Two sets of frequencies separated by approximately 5 megacycles are used for this purpose [...]. In addition to the primary mode of communications, the USB system has the capability of receiving data on two other frequencies. These are used primarily for the transmission of FM data from the spacecraft.

== Frequencies ==
The Unified S-Band System used the 2025–2120 MHz band for transmission to the spacecraft (uplinks), and used the 2200–2290 MHz band for transmissions from the spacecraft (downlinks). These bands are allocated internationally for space research and operations, though by 2014 standards the ALSEP uplink was in the wrong part of the band (deep space instead of near earth).

Apollo frequency assignments
Spacecraft	To Earth (MHz)	To Space (MHz)	Coherent ratio
Command Module PM	2287.5	2106.40625	221/240
Command Module FM	2272.5		
Lunar Module	2282.5	2101.802083	221/240
S-IVB PM	2282.5	2101.802083	221/240
S-IVB FM	2277.5		
Lunar Rover	2265.5	2101.802083	
Apollo 11 Early ALSEP	2276.5	2119	
Apollo 12 ALSEP	2278.5	2119	
Apollo 14 ALSEP	2279.5	2119	
Apollo 15 ALSEP	2278.0	2119	
Apollo 15 subsatellite	2282.5	2101.802083	221/240
Apollo 16 ALSEP	2276.0	2119	
Apollo 17 ALSEP	2275.5	2119	

The Lunar Communications Relay Unit (LCRU) on the Lunar Rover (Apollo 15, 16, 17) had its own downlink frequency (to avoid interference with the LM) but shared the LM's uplink frequency as it did not implement a coherent transponder. Separate voice subcarriers were used on the common S-band uplink, 30 kHz for the LM and 124 kHz for the LCRU, so that the LM and LCRU would not both relay uplink voice and interfere with each other.

The S-IVB had a USB tracking transponder for use after separation of the CSM. The tracking data improved the analysis of the impact recorded by the seismometers left by earlier Apollo crews. The S-IVB used the same frequency pair as the LM. Normally the LM was inactive during flight, however, this was a problem when during the Apollo 13 flight as the LM had to be powered up early to be used as a life boat.

The LM frequencies were also used by subsatellites deployed in lunar orbit after the LM had departed the Moon, as part of the later J-missions.

The use of two separated frequency bands made full duplex operation possible. The ground and the spacecraft transmitted continuously. Microphone audio was keyed manually or by VOX, but unlike ordinary half duplex two-way radio both sides could talk at the same time without mutual interference.

== Modulation ==
The S-band system usually used phase modulation (PM). PM, like FM, has a constant amplitude (envelope) regardless of modulation. This allows nonlinear RF amplifiers to be used, which are more efficient than RF amplifiers that must maintain linearity.

The PM modulation index is small, so the signal resembled double sideband amplitude modulation (AM) except for the carrier phase. In AM, the carrier component has a constant amplitude as the sidebands vary with modulation, but in PM the total signal power is constant amplitude. PM shifts power from the carrier to the sidebands with modulation, and at some modulation indices the carrier can disappear completely. This is why Apollo uses a low modulation index: to leave a strong carrier that can be used for highly accurate velocity tracking by measurement of its Doppler shift.

== Coherent transponders and Doppler tracking ==
For certain phase modulation (PM) downlinks, the uplink to downlink frequency ratio was exactly 221/240, with a coherent transponders used. A phase locked loop on the spacecraft multiplied the uplink carrier frequency by 240/221 to produce the downlink carrier frequency. A local oscillator produced the downlink carrier if the uplink was not available.

This "two-way" technique allowed velocity measurements with a precision on the order of centimeters/second, by observing the Doppler shift of the downlink carrier. The technique did not require a high accuracy oscillator on the spacecraft, although one was still needed on the ground.

The ALSEP lunar surface experiments shared a common uplink and did not have a coherent transponder. The passive laser retroreflectors left by the Apollo 11, 14 and 15 missions provide much greater accuracy, and have far outlived the active electronics in the other ALSEP experiments.

== Subcarriers ==
As mentioned above, the uplink and downlink carriers played a critical role in spacecraft tracking. Sidebands generated by the information also carried by the system had to be kept away from the carriers to avoid perturbing the phase locked loops used to track them. This was done through the use of various subcarriers.

The uplink had two subcarriers. The 30 kHz subcarrier had (Capcom) voice and the 70 kHz carrier had command data to update the flight computers with ground tracking data, and for the command to deorbit the lunar module once it had been jettisoned.

Subcarriers could be turned off when not needed. This improved the signal margins for the other information streams such as telemetry data. The downlink had subcarriers at 1.25 MHz (NBFM voice) and 1.024 MHz (telemetry data). Telemetry could be set at 1.6 kilobits/sec or 51.2 kilobits/sec. The lower rate was only used during poor link conditions, or to conserve power. A "backup voice" mode shut off the 1.25 MHz NBFM subcarrier and transmitted voice on the main S-band carrier. This provided more margin but worse voice quality than the mode used in good conditions.

The modes can be identified by how they sound during signal fades. In the preferred NBFM subcarrier mode, as the link degrades, impulse or "popcorn" noise appears suddenly and grows until it covers the astronauts' voices. During the Apollo 11 lunar landing, this was illustrated when the lunar module occasionally blocked the antenna's line of sight Earth. The backup voice mode behaved more like AM. The voices change as the signal fades, and there is constant background hiss. The backup mode was used in the Apollo 13 emergency to save power, and also when the Apollo 16 steerable S-band antenna failed on the lunar module.

Voice transmissions used Quindar tones for in-band signaling.

== Emergency key ==
The Apollo USB downlink also had an "emergency key" mode for a subcarrier oscillator at 512 kHz. This could have been used to send Morse Code if voice mode wasn't possible. Though this mode was tested during Apollo 7, it was never required.

A similar uplink capability was not needed because the uplink had far more power available. The Apollo S-band spacecraft transmitters produced 20 watts; an uplink transmitter produced 10 kW, a ratio of 27 dB.

== Ranging ==
The Apollo S-band system provided for accurate range (distance) measurements. The ground station generated a pseudorandom noise (PN) sequence at 994 kilobit/s and added it to the baseband signal going to the PM transmitter. The transponder echoed the sequence. By correlating the received and transmitted versions the elapsed time and so the distance to the spacecraft could be determined within 15 meters.

The PN sequence, although deterministic, had the properties of a random bit stream. Although the PN sequence was periodic, its period of about 5 seconds exceeded the largest possible round trip time to the Moon so there would be no ambiguity in its received timing.

Modern GPS receivers work somewhat similarly in that they also correlate a received PN bit stream (at 1.023 Mbit/s) with a local reference to measure distance. But GPS is a receive-only system that uses relative timing measurements from a set of satellites to determine receiver position while the Apollo USB is a two-way system that can only determine the instantaneous distance and relative velocity. However, an orbit determination program can find the unique spacecraft state vector from range, range-rate (relative velocity) and antenna look angle observations made by one or more ground stations assuming purely ballistic spacecraft motion over the observation interval.

Once the state vector has been determined, the spacecraft's future trajectory can be fully predicted until the next propulsive event.

Transponder ranging turn-around had to be manually enabled by an astronaut. It used much of the downlink bandwidth capacity and it was only needed occasionally, such as during handover between ground stations. When the uplink station locked onto the transponder, it would range the spacecraft. Doppler velocity measurements updated the range and the ranging signal was shut off. If a ground station lost lock during a pass, it would repeat the ranging measurement after re-acquiring lock.

== FM and video ==
Normally the downlink transmitter was PM, to allow for coherent Doppler tracking. This also supported commands, telemetry and two-way voice. Video signals required more bandwidth than was available on this system. Other wideband signals such as scientific data or engineering data also required more bandwidth. A wideband frequency modulation system provided improved signal-to-noise ratio owing to the capture effect. This improves the signal-to-noise ratio for RF signals with more than 8-10 dB of signal-to-noise ratio (SNR). However, below this threshold the wideband signal has a worse SNR. Reception is "all or nothing". If the receiving antenna is too small to capture the wideband video, the narrowband signals such as voice cannot be received either.

The CSM had FM and PM transmitters that operated for concurrent transmission of voice, telemetry and video. The LM transmitter could transmit only FM or PM, but not simultaneously in both modes. Since frequency modulation makes Doppler tracking ineffective, the lander only sent FM when transmitting video.

== Interception ==
The USSR monitored the Apollo missions' telemetry.

In the US it was legal for amateur radio operators to monitor the telemetry, but the FCC did issue a directive that required all disclosure of Apollo telemetry interception be cleared by NASA. In August 1971, radio amateurs Paul Wilson (W4HHK) and Richard T. Knadle, Jr. (K2RIW) heard voice signals from Apollo 15 while it circled the Moon. They described their work in an article for QST. They also reported that they had received signals from Apollo 16.

== Design influences ==
The International Space Station, Skylab as well as other orbital space stations have (or have had) some kind of unified microwave communications subsystem. The USB system is similar and was influenced by the SGLS (space-ground link system) system developed for the Dyna-Soar program and later adopted for the Air Force Satellite Control Network. The lasting engineering influence of the USB is that almost every human mission in space has had a unified microwave communications system of some kind.
