= List of NASA's flight control positions =

This list describe NASA's flight controllers, primarily at the Johnson Space Center (JSC) in Houston, but also associated positions at other organizations serving NASA.

== Apollo flight control positions ==
The flight control positions used during the Apollo era were predominantly identical to the positions used for the Mercury and Gemini vehicles. This was because of the similarity of the vehicle design of the capsules used for the three programs.

Booster systems engineer
The booster systems engineer monitored and evaluated performance of propulsion-related aspects of the launch vehicle during prelaunch and ascent. During the Apollo program there were three booster positions, who worked only until trans-lunar injection (TLI) was complete; after that, their consoles were vacated. Booster had the power to send an abort command to the spacecraft. All booster technicians were employed at the Marshall Space Flight Center and reported to JSC for the launches.

Control officer
The control officer was responsible for the Apollo Lunar Module guidance, navigation, and control systems – essentially the equivalent of the GNC for the Command and Service Module.

Electrical, environmental, and consumables manager (EECOM)
The EECOM monitored cryogenic levels for fuel cells, and cabin cooling systems; electrical distribution systems; cabin pressure control systems; and vehicle lighting systems. EECOM originally stood for electrical, environmental and communication systems. The Apollo EECOM was responsible for CSM communications through Apollo 10. Afterward the communication task was moved to a new console named INCO.
Perhaps the most famous NASA EECOMs are Seymour "Sy" Liebergot, the EECOM on duty at the time of the oxygen tank explosion on Apollo 13, and John Aaron, who designed the drastically reduced power budget for its return. Aaron also saved the Apollo 12 mission by realizing that using the backup power supply for telemetry of analog capsule sensors would allow diagnosis of all the seemingly-unrelated problems caused by a lightning strike.

Flight director
The flight directors held overall control of all of the individual positions in the MOCR.
Some Apollo era directors were:
- Gene Kranz, White Flight. Apollo missions 7, 9, 11, 13, 15, 16 and 17.
- Glynn Lunney, Black Flight. Apollo missions 7, 8, 10, 11, 13, 14 and 15.
- Gerry Griffin, Gold Flight. Apollo missions 7, 9, 11, 12, 13, 14, 15, 16 and 17.
- Milt Windler, Maroon Flight. Apollo missions 8, 10, 12, 13, 14 and 15.
- Clifford E. Charlesworth, Green Flight. Apollo missions 8, 11 and 12.
- M. P. (Pete) Frank, Orange Flight. Apollo missions 9, 12, 16, 17, and Apollo–Soyuz.
- Neil B. Hutchinson, Silver Flight. Apollo missions 16, 17 and Apollo-Soyuz.

Flight activities officer (FAO)
The FAO planned and supported crew activities, checklists, procedures and schedules.

Flight dynamics officer (FDO or FIDO)
Responsible for the flight path of the space vehicle, both atmospheric and orbital. During lunar missions the FDO was also responsible for the lunar trajectory. The FDO monitored vehicle performance during the powered flight phase and assessed abort modes, calculated orbital maneuvers and resulting trajectories, and monitored vehicle flight profile and energy levels during reentry.

Guidance officer (GUIDANCE or GUIDO)
The guidance officer monitored on board navigational systems and on board guidance computer software. Responsible for determining the position of the spacecraft in space. One well-known guidance officer was Steve Bales, who gave the go call when the Apollo 11 guidance computer came close to overloading during the first lunar descent.

Guidance, navigation, and controls systems engineer (GNC)
The GNC monitored all vehicle guidance, navigation, and control systems. Also responsible for propulsion systems such as the service propulsion system and reaction control system (RCS).

Integrated communications officer (INCO)
The INCO was responsible for all data, voice and video communications systems, including monitoring the configuration of in-flight communications and instrumentation systems. Duties also included monitoring the telemetry link between the vehicle and the ground, and overseeing the uplink command and control processes. The position was formed from the combination of LEM and CSM communicator positions.

Network
Supervised the network of ground stations that relayed telemetry and communications from the spacecraft.

Organization and procedures officer (O&P)
Supervised the application of mission rules and established techniques to the conduct of the flight.

Retrofire officer (RETRO)
Drew up abort plans and was responsible for determination of retrofire times. During lunar missions the RETRO planned and monitored Trans Earth Injection (TEI) maneuvers, where the Apollo Service Module fired its engine to return to Earth from the Moon.

Telemetry, electrical, EVA mobility unit officer (TELMU)
Monitored the lunar module electrical and environmental systems, plus lunar astronaut spacesuits. Essentially the equivalent of the EECOM for the lunar module.

== Shuttle and Space Station flight controllers ==
NASA currently has a group of flight controllers at the Johnson Space Center in Houston for the International Space Station (ISS). The Space Shuttle flight control team (as well as those for the earlier Gemini, Apollo, and Skylab programs) were also based there. Console manning for short-duration and extended operations differed in operational philosophy.

The Space Shuttle (and prior program) flight controllers worked relatively brief periods: The several minutes of ascent, the few days the vehicle was in orbit, and reentry. The duration of operations for Space Shuttle flight controllers was short and time-critical. A failure on the Shuttle could leave flight controllers little time for talking, putting pressure on them to respond quickly to potential failures. The Space Shuttle flight controllers generally had limited capability to send commands to the shuttle for system reconfigurations.

In contrast, the ISS flight controllers work 24 hours a day, 365 days a year. This allows the ISS flight controllers time to discuss off-nominal telemetry. The ISS flight controllers have the opportunity to interface with many groups and engineering experts. The mentality of an ISS flight controller is to preempt a failure. Telemetry is closely monitored for any signatures that may begin to indicate future catastrophic failures. Generally, ISS flight controllers take a prophylactic approach to space vehicle operations. There are command capabilities that ISS flight controllers use to preclude a potential failure.

=== Shuttle flight control positions (1981-2011) ===
Many Apollo program mission control positions were carried forward to the Space Shuttle program. However, other positions were eliminated or redefined, and new positions were added.

Positions remaining generally the same:

- Booster
- FAO
- FDO
- Guidance (became guidance and procedures officer, or GPO)
- GNC
- INCO (became instrumentation and communications officer)

Positions eliminated or modified:

- RETRO
- EECOM (duties split up)
- TELMU
- CONTROL

After retirement of the Space Shuttle in 2011, the operational concept of flight control of a launched crewed vehicle was used as the basis for the Boeing Starliner Commercial Crew vehicle starting in 2019.

Assembly and checkout officer (ACO)/payloads
Responsible for all Space Shuttle-based activities related to construction and operation of the Space Station, including logistics and transfer items stored in a multi-purpose logistics module (MPLM) or Spacehab. Also responsible for all Shuttle payloads, from Spacehab to the Hubble Space Telescope to deployable satellites. On Shuttle missions that did not dock with the ISS, this position was known as payloads.

Booster systems engineer (BOOSTER)
Monitored and evaluated performance of propulsion-related aspects of the launch vehicle during prelaunch and ascent, including the main engines and solid rocket boosters.

Data processing system engineer (DPS)
Responsible for data processing systems in a space flight. This included monitoring the on board General Purpose Computers (GPCs), flight-critical, launch and payload data buses, the multi-function electronic display system (MEDS), solid-state mass memory (SSMM) units, flight critical and payload multiplexer/de-multiplexer (MDM) units, master timing unit (MTU), backup flight control (BFC) units and system-level software. The Space Shuttle general purpose computers were a critical subsystem, and the vehicle cannot fly without them.

Emergency, environmental, and consumables management (EECOM)
EECOM's revamped Space Shuttle responsibilities included the atmospheric pressure control and revitalization systems, the cooling systems (air, water, and freon), and the supply/waste water system.
EECOM's critical function was to maintain the systems, such as atmosphere and thermal control, that keep the crew alive.
The corresponding multi-purpose support room (MPSR) positions are:
* Life support – monitored atmospheric pressure control systems, O_{2}/N_{2}/CO_{2} maintenance and management, air cooling equipment, waste water systems,
* Thermal – monitored water and refrigerant coolant loop systems, supply water maintenance

Electrical generation and integrated lighting systems engineer (EGIL)
Monitored cryogenic levels for the fuel cells, electrical generation and distribution systems on the spacecraft, and vehicle lighting. This was a portion of the job formerly done by EECOM.
MPSR positions
* EPS – provided expert support monitoring of the fuel cells, cryo system, and electrical bus system

Extravehicular activity officer (EVA)
Responsible for all spacesuit and spacewalking-related tasks, equipment and plans when the EVA took place from the shuttle.

Flight activities officer (FAO)
Planned and supported crew activities, checklists, procedures, schedules, attitude maneuvers and timelines.
MPSR positions:
- Attitude and pointing officer (Pointing) – Generated and maintained the attitude timeline, monitored the executions of all attitude maneuvers, provided attitude maneuver inputs for the crew, generated star pairs and attitudes for IMU aligns.
- Message and timeline support (MATS) – Created messages based on MCC inputs, created the execute package, monitored crew activities and assessed impacts to the timeline.
- Orbital communications officer (OCA) – Transferred electronic messages to the crew, synced the crews e-mail, uplinked and downlinked files for the crew.
- Timeline – Generated the pre-flight timelines for the flight plan, monitored in-flight crew activities, coordinated activities with other flight controllers.

Flight dynamics officer (FDO or FIDO)
Responsible for the flight path of the Space Shuttle, both atmospheric and orbital. FDO monitored vehicle performance during the powered flight phase and assessed abort modes, calculated orbital maneuvers and resulting trajectories, and monitored vehicle flight profile and energy levels during re-entry.
MPSR positions
- Abort support (ascent only) – provided expert support during the powered flight portion of an RTLS or TAL
- ARD support (ascent only) – maintained the abort region determinator processor which is used to predict trajectory capabilities during powered flight
- Ascent support team (ascent only) – monitored the winds and weather at the launch site, help compute day-of-launch updates
- Dynamics – maintained the inputs to the mission operation computer for all processors
- Entry console – provided expert support for entry, approach, and landing
- Entry support team (ascent and entry) – monitored the winds and weather at the various potential landing sites, prepare trajectory adjustments
- Landing support officer (LSO) team – maintained the airspace at any landing site, dispatch Search and Rescue teams if needed, act as first liaison in case of a landing outside the US
- Nav support team – responsible for maintaining the on-board navigation (telemetry) and the ground navigation (tracking)
- Profile support (rendezvous only) – assisted the FDO with rendezvous profile evaluation and determination
- Range safety team (ascent only) – tracked the falling external tank and solid rocket boosters
- Targeting (ascent only) – provided expert support for abort to orbit (ATO) or abort once around (AOA) trajectories
- Track – coordinated tracking site data flow and data requests
- Weather – a member of the spaceflight meteorology group who provided worldwide weather data

Ground controller (GC)
Directed maintenance and operation activities affecting Mission Control hardware, software and support facilities; coordinated space flight tracking and data network, and Tracking and Data Relay Satellite system with Goddard Space Flight Center.

Guidance, navigation, and controls systems engineer (GNC)
Monitored all shuttle guidance, navigation and control systems.
MPSR positions
- GNC Support: Provided support to the orbit GNC officer during the orbit phase of flight.
- Control: Provided support to the ascent/entry GNC officer during those phases of flight.
- Sensors: Provided support to the ascent/entry GNC officer during those phases of flight.

Instrumentation and communications officer (INCO)
Responsible for all data, voice and video communications systems, including monitoring the configuration of in-flight communications and instrumentation systems. Duties also included monitoring the telemetry link between the vehicle and the ground, and overseeing the uplink command and control processes. The INCO was the only position that uplinked commands to the orbiter. This position was a direct evolution of the integrated communications officer from the Apollo program.
MPSR positions
- RF COMM: MPSR lead and responsible for the Ku-band and S-band communication systems.
- INST: Responsible for uplinking commands and telemetry flows.
- DATA COMM: Responsible for recording and downlinking telemetry that was not streamed live and the FM communication system.

Mechanical, maintenance, arm, and crew systems (MMACS)
Responsible for Space Shuttle structural and mechanical systems, monitoring auxiliary power units and hydraulic systems, managing payload bay door, external tank umbilical door, vent door, radiator deploy/stow, Ku-band antenna deploy/stow, and payload retention latch operations, landing gear/deceleration systems (landing gear deploy, tires, brakes/antiskid, and drag chute deploy), and monitoring the orbiter docking system. MMACS also followed use of on board crew hardware and in-flight equipment maintenance. This represented another portion of the job formerly done by EECOM, with additional responsibilities added by the specific requirements of Space Shuttle operations. The MMACS officer served as the point of contact for PDRS, Booster, and EVA during periods in a mission when these positions did not require constant staffing.
MPSR positions
- MECH – provided expert support monitoring of mechanical, hydraulic, and landing gear systems
- MECH 2 – provided extra support during the dynamic ascent and entry phases of flight
- IFM – In-flight maintenance support
- Crew systems/escape – responsible for operations of on board crew hardware and the crew's launch and entry suits
- Photo/TV – responsible for the "loose" camera operation and maintenance, such as still cameras and camcorders, and the integration of video into and out of the orbiter's TV monitors

Payload deployment and retrieval system (PDRS)
Responsible for Space Shuttle remote manipulator system (RMS) or "robot arm".

Propulsion engineer (PROP)
Managed the reaction control thrusters and orbital maneuvering engines during all phases of flight, monitored fuel usage and propellant tank status, and calculated optimal sequences for thruster firings.
MPSR Positions
- OMS & RCS Engine Officer (OREO): Monitored health of shuttle on-orbit engines
- Consumables: Monitored fuel usage and mass properties through the mission

Rendezvous (RNDZ)
Responsible for activities such as trajectory operations related to the rendezvous and docking/capture with another spacecraft, including Mir, the ISS, and satellites such as the Hubble Space Telescope.

Trajectory officer (TRAJ)
Assisted the FDO during time-critical operations, responsible for maintaining the various processors that helped determine the shuttle's current and potential trajectories. A FDO was certified as a TRAJ first. Shares the FCR with FDO.

Transoceanic abort landing communicator (TALCOM)
One of the few members of Shuttle Mission Control not physically present in Houston. If an emergency had occurred, such as loss of one or more main engine during a Space Shuttle launch, requiring the shuttle to land at one of the contingency landing sites in Africa, Europe or the Middle East, TALCOM would have assumed the role of CAPCOM providing communications with astronauts aboard the crippled orbiter. Like CAPCOM, the TALCOM role was filled by an astronaut. Three astronauts were deployed to the alternate landing sites in Zaragoza Air Base and Moron Air Base in Spain, and Istres Air Base in France. These astronauts flew aboard weather reconnaissance aircraft to provide support at the selected landing site.

=== ISS flight control positions to 2010 ===
The International Space Station flight control positions used by NASA in Houston are different from those used by previous NASA programs. These differences exist primarily to stem the potential confusion that might otherwise follow from conflicting use of the same name in two different rooms during the same operations, such as when the space shuttle was conducting mated operations with the space station. There are also differences in the control positions because of differences in the operation of the two. The following is a list of those flight controllers located in Mission Control Center – Houston. There are several other control centers which house dozens of other flight controllers that support the vastly complex vehicle.

Positions formerly used but eliminated or modified:

- Assembly and checkout officer (ACO) – Retired position at end of shuttle. Was responsible for the integration of assembly and activation tasks for all ISS systems and elements. Coordinated with station and shuttle flight controllers on the execution of these operations. Was also the front room position to ACO Transfer who was responsible for the exchange of cargo between the shuttle and the ISS.
- Cargo integration officer (CIO) – Former front room position that answered for ISO and PLUTO
- Station duty officer (SDO) – During early phases of ISS, when the vehicle was free-flying (no shuttle present) and uncrewed, the SDO and GC were the only positions on duty, and would call in the appropriate personnel if any problems arose.

Starting in 2001, the ISS flight control room has consolidated six of the below positions into just two, TITAN and ATLAS, to reduce staffing during low-activity periods. This concept is known as Gemini. After Assembly complete, the Gemini concept was eliminated in the realignment of the core ISS flight control positions.

- Telemetry, Information Transfer, and Attitude Navigation (TITAN) is responsible for Communication & Tracking (CATO), Command & Data Handling (ODIN), and Motion Control Systems (ADCO).
- Atmosphere, Thermal, Lighting and Articulation Specialist (ATLAS) is responsible for Thermal Control (THOR), Environmental Control & Life Support (ECLSS), and Electrical Power Systems (PHALCON). ATLAS is also responsible for monitoring Robotics (ROBO) and Mechanical Systems (OSO) heaters, as those consoles are not supported during the majority of Gemini shifts.

Attitude determination and control officer (ADCO)
Works in partnership with Russian controllers to determine and manage the station's orientation, controlled by the on board motion control systems. This position also plans and calculates future orientations and maneuvers for the station and is responsible for docking the ISS with other vehicles.
MPSR position: HawkI – Pronounced (Hawk-eye) – provides expert support monitoring of all US GNC systems, leaving the ADCO to coordinate with other flight controllers and MCC-M. Hawki is actually a strung-together set of common engineering abbreviations for quantities that affect or reflect ISS attitude, primarily chosen because they fit well enough to make a name: H – Momentum; α – angular rate; ω – angular velocity; k – kinetic energy; I – moment of inertia.

Biomedical engineer (BME)
The BME monitors health-related station systems and Crew Health Care Systems (CHeCS) equipment. The BME provides technical and operational support for CHeCS and all other medical operations activities. Along with the SURGEON, the BME serves as a Medical Operations Branch representative to the USOS Flight Control Team.

Communication and tracking officer (CATO)
Responsible for management and operations of the U.S. communication systems, including audio, video, telemetry and commanding systems.

Environmental control and life support system (ECLSS)
Responsible for the assembly and operation of systems related to atmosphere control and supply, atmosphere revitalization, cabin air temperature and humidity control, circulation, fire detection and suppression, water collection and processing and crew hygiene equipment, among other areas.
MPSR Position: ACE (Atmosphere and Consumables Engineer)

Extravehicular activity officer (EVA)
Responsible for all spacesuit and spacewalking-related tasks, equipment and plans when the EVA takes place from the ISS.

Inventory and stowage officer (ISO)
Responsible for the daily tracking and inventory of all US cargo on the ISS. ISO is the integrator for all cargo that is delivered to and from the ISS for ATV, HTV, Dragon, and Cygnus vehicles.

Integration systems engineer (ISE)
A specialist position, the ISE is the systems liaison between ISS and visiting vehicles that are berthed to the US side of ISS. The ISE flight control is responsible for the safety of the ISS such that the visiting vehicle can safely approach, berth, and integrate with the ISS. This includes HTV, Dragon, Cygnus, and even special missions like the deployment of Bigelow Expandable Activity Module (BEAM). ISE works closely with VVO.

Onboard data interfaces and networks (ODIN)
The ODIN is responsible for the Command and Data Handling (C&DH) system, the Portable Computer System (PCS) computers, the Caution & Warning (C&W) system, overall responsibility for commanding, and interfaces with International Partner avionics systems. The C&DH system consists of the Multiplexer/DeMultiplexers (MDMs) which are the ISS computers. Core software in each MDM (not User Application Software), the MIL-STD-1553 data busses, Automated Payload Switches (APSs), fiber optic network, Payload Ethernet Hub Gateway (PEHG), and the Ethernet network. This does not include the Ops LAN, Station Support Computers (SSC), or file server.
- MPSR positions: Resource avionics engineer (RAVEN)

Operations planner (OPSPLAN)
Leads the coordination, development and maintenance of the station's short-term plan, including crew and ground activities. The plan includes the production and uplink of the on board station plan and the coordination and maintenance of the on board inventory and stowage listings.
MPSR positions
- Real time planning engineer (RPE)
- Real time planning engineer support (RPE-Support)
- Orbital communications adapter officer (OCA)
- on board data file and procedures officer (ODF)

Operations support officer (OSO)
Charged with those logistics support functions that address on-orbit maintenance, support data and documentation, logistics information systems, maintenance data collection and maintenance analysis. The OSO is also responsible for mechanical systems—such as those used to attach new modules or truss sections to the vehicle during assembly.
MPSR position: OSO Support

Plug-in port utilization officer (PLUTO)
The name PLUTO is inherited from the flight controller's original role, which was to maintain and coordinate changes to the U.S. segment of the electrical plug-in plan (PiP). The PiP is the tracking of portable electronic equipment, making sure equipment connected is compatible and does not violate constraints, and will not overdraw the power source. Along with this, PLUTO is responsible for maintaining the OPSLAN (Operations Local Area Network) and the JSL (Joint Station LAN). PLUTO has remote desktop administration and monitoring capability to the network from the ground. The PLUTO is also responsible for certain Station Developmental Test Objectives, or SDTOs during the mission. This includes programming the Wireless Instrumentation System (WIS) and also remote desktop commanding for ROBONAUT activities.
MPSR position: Hydra

Power, heating, articulation, lighting control officer (PHALCON)
Manages the power generation, storage, and power distribution capabilities.

Remote interface officer (RIO)
Formerly known as the Russian interface officer. Responsible for integrating operations between MCC-Houston (MCC-H) and the other International Partner (IP) Control Centers. RIO is a FCR-1 position in MCC-Houston and works closely in conjunction with the Houston Support Group (HSG) teams located at the IP Control Centers:
- HSG-Moscow (HSG-M): Team of NASA Flight Controllers working with Russian Flight Controllers at MCC-Moscow (MCC-M). Responsible for integrating operations between MCC-H and MCC-M. HSG-M also has taken over operations of the US segment of ISS during Hurricanes Lili and Rita (2002 and 2005, respectively). MSFC in Huntsville took over ISS Backup Control Center operations from HSG-M in 2008.
- HSG-Columbus (HSG-C): Small team of NASA Flight Controllers that were responsible for integrating MCC-H and Columbus Control Center (COL-CC) operations at Oberpfaffenhofen, near Munich, Germany. Following completion of Columbus commissioning in August 2008, this team discontinued operations.
- HSG-ATV (HSG-A): Small team of NASA Flight Controllers responsible for integrating MCC-H and Autonomous Transfer Vehicle (ATV) operations at ATV-CC near Toulouse, France. Following completion of the ATV5 mission in February 2015, this team discontinued operations.
- HSG-Japan (HSG-J): Small team of NASA Flight Controllers responsible for integrating MCC-H and Japanese Experiment Module (JEM) and H-II Transfer Vehicle (HTV) operations at the Space Station Integration and Promotions Center (SSIPC) at Tsukuba, Japan near Tokyo. This team discontinued permanent operations in October 2008, but afterwards did temporarily support the STS-127 and HTV-1 missions.

Robotics operations systems officer (ROBO)
Responsible for the operations of the Canadian Mobile Servicing System (MSS), which includes a mobile base system, station robotic arm, station robotic hand or special purpose dexterous manipulator. (Call sign: ROBO) represents a joint NASA-Canadian Space Agency team of specialists to plan and execute robotic operations.
MPSR positions:
- MSS Systems
- MSS Task

Thermal operations and resources (THOR)
Responsible for the assembly and operation of multiple station subsystems which collect, distribute, and reject waste heat from critical equipment and payloads.

Trajectory operations officer (TOPO)
Responsible for the station trajectory. The TOPO works in partnership with Russian controllers, ADCO, and the U.S. Space Command to maintain data regarding the station's orbital position. TOPO plans all station orbital maneuvers.

Visiting vehicle officer (VVO)
A specialist position, the VVO is the guidance and navigation liaison between the ISS and "visiting vehicles" such as Progress, Soyuz or Dragon.

=== ISS flight control positions 2010–present ===
After "Assembly Complete" in 2010 (which was the name given to the phase following the completion of the ISS assembly using the Space Shuttle), the core ISS flight control positions were realigned and the Gemini manning concept eliminated. While the other specialty positions – ADCO, BME, EVA, ISO, ISE, OPSPLAN, OSO, PLUTO, RIO, ROBO, TOPO, and VVO – remain the same, the new core positions are:

Communications RF on board networks utilization specialist (CRONUS)
This is a combination of the previous ODIN and CATO positions. Responsibilities for this group include the control and monitoring of on-board command and data systems (i.e. computers). Video cameras, both on board and external, are managed by CRONUS. The Caution And Warning System is also used to alert the crew and flight controllers to serious and dangerous safety situations. Communication radios, both for space-to-ground communication (S-Band and Ku-Band) and space-to-space communication (C2V2) are operated by CRONUS.
MPSR position: RAPTOR

Environmental and Thermal operating systems (ETHOS)
This consists of the ECLSS system responsibilities as well as the internal thermal control systems from THOR.
MPSR position: TREC

Station power, articulation, thermal, and analysis (SPARTAN)
This consists of the electrical power (old PHALCON) and external thermal control systems from THOR.
MPSR position: SPOC

== Exploration Flight Test-1 (2014) ==
The Orion program, later to become part of the Artemis program, had its own flight control team, mostly derived from Space Shuttle flight control positions. The Primary Team sat in the main flight control room (FCR), while the Support Team sat in the various multi-purpose support rooms (MPSRs) nearby. All positions named below had similar responsibilities to their Shuttle counterparts. The Orion flight control team operated out of the Blue FCR, which had previously been used in the early days of ISS. As this was an uncrewed mission, the CAPCOM and SURGEON were not needed on console.

Command and Data Handling (C&DH)
Responsible for the command and data handling system, including the flight control module, the on-board storage module, the Orion data network and portions of the power and data units.
Support team position: C&DH Support

Emergency, Environmental, and Consumables manager (EECOM)
Responsible for spacecraft pressure control and active thermal control systems.
Support team position: EECOM Support

Electrical Power System Officer (EPS)
Responsible for spacecraft electrical and mechanical systems.
Support team position: EPS MPSR

Flight Dynamics Officer (FDO)
Responsible for the pre-launch heading alignment update and orbit and entry trajectory predictions.
Support team positions:
- DOD-H
- Landing Support Officer (LSO) - responsible for relaying mission status and milestones to external interfaces, such as the State Department, the Department of Defense, the recovery team, NASA Headquarters and others as required
- Trajectory Officer (TRAJ)
- Weather - responsible for providing landing and contingency weather forecasts, as well as sea state information; located in a supporting room in the Mission Control Center

Flight Director (FLIGHT)
The responsible authority for the spacecraft between liftoff and the post-splashdown handover to the Orion recovery team. Provide a go or no-go decision for Orion's launch to the Mission Management Team and provide recommendations on operations outside the flight rules as needed.

Flight Operations Directorate (FOD)
Formerly known as MOD (Mission Operations Directorate), the console position representing the Directorate was renamed when the directorate itself was, taking the Apollo-era name of Flight Operations Directorate.

Ground Control Officer (GC)
Responsible for ground data systems and data flows that interface with the Mission Control Center.

Guidance Navigation and Control Officer (GNC)
Responsible for operations of the navigation hardware, including inertial measurement units, barometric altimeters and the GPS receiver and antennas.
Support team positions:
- GNC Support
- Nav

Guidance Officer (GUIDANCE)
Responsible for the onboard navigation performance; launch vehicle and onboard navigation state vector quality assessments; guidance performance monitoring and associated flight test objectives evaluations; ground navigation processing and best state vector source determination; and the Mission Control Center contingency state vector update command.
Support team position: Pointing

Instrumentation and Communications Officer (INCO)
Responsible for Orion's communication systems, development flight instrumentation systems, video systems and recovery beacon; INCO sends all nominal and contingency commands to Orion.
Support team position: INCO Support

Public Affairs Officer (PAO)

Propulsion Officer (PROP)
Responsible for the propulsion system hardware and software.
Support team position: PROP Support

== Commercial Crew, 2019-present ==
With the start of the Commercial Crew program, the private companies operating the spacecraft manages their own Mission Control Center for launch, orbit, and entry operations. SpaceX built out its own mission control center inside its Hawthorne, California facility, known as MCC-X. Boeing leases out a flight control room from NASA inside the Johnson Space Center, and down the hall from the ISS flight control room, known as MCC-CST.

=== SpaceX ===
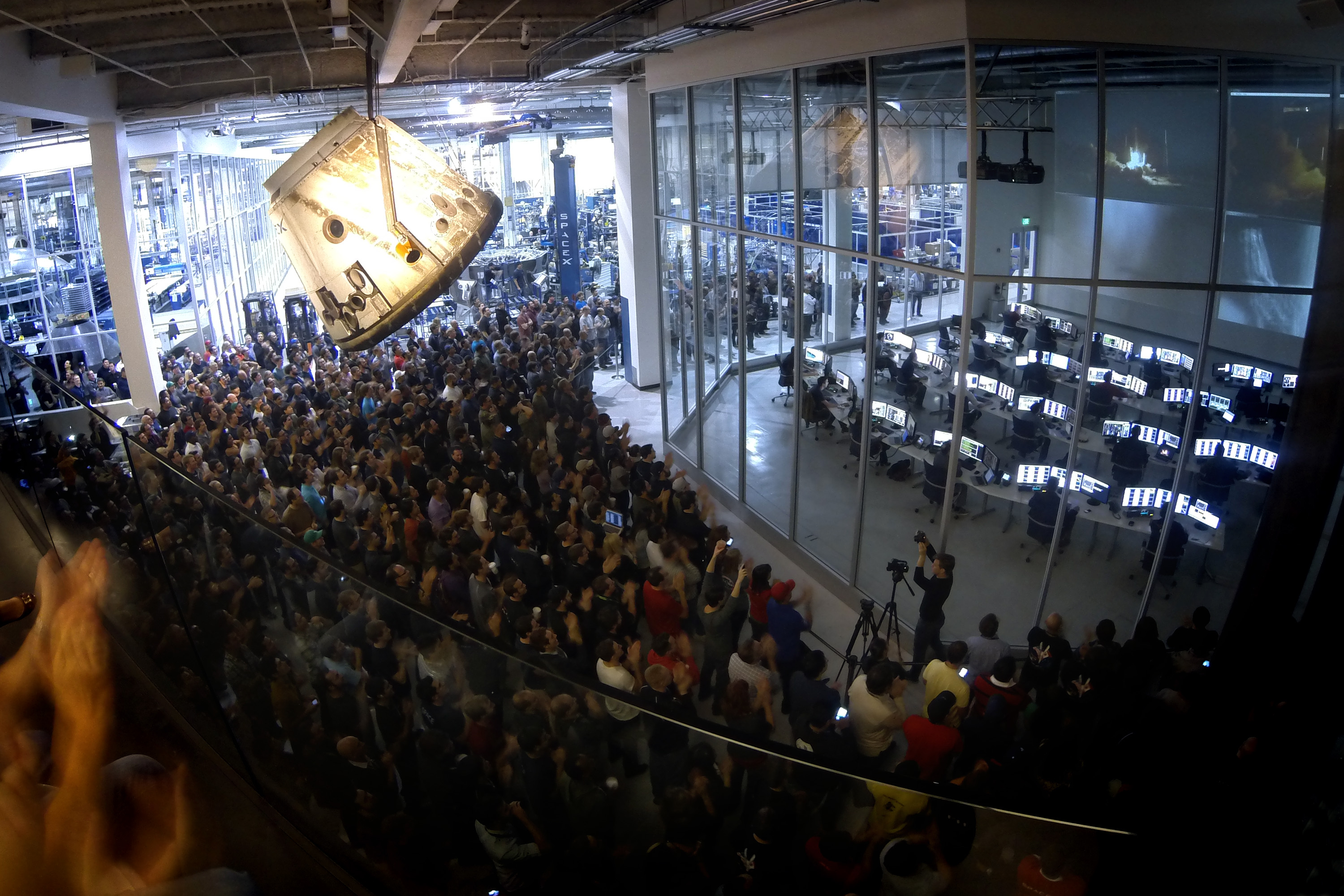
SpaceX Mission Control Center, Hawthorne, California

SpaceX manages its own Mission Control Center (MCC-X) inside its Hawthorne, California facility and has publicly revealed few details on its operations. About 25 flight controllers work in the control room during a crewed launch. However, the company does have one high-profile flight controller, called the CORE.

Crew Operations and Resources Engineer (CORE)
For SpaceX crewed flights, the Crew Operations and Resource Engineer (CORE) replaces CAPCOM, and acts as the relay between ground controllers at MCC-X at the SpaceX facility in Hawthorne and the crew in space. The CORE, who uses the radio call-sign SpaceX is a SpaceX employee, typically from the ranks of the engineers at SpaceX who participate in the training of astronauts on the Dragon, so that there is a level of familiarity between the CORE and the astronauts in space.

=== Boeing ===
Boeing, in contrast to SpaceX, largely pays NASA to staff its Mission Control Center during operations of the Boeing Starliner. Consequently, NASA has revealed a great deal about how the MCC-CST operates, and it is largely derived from the Space Shuttle flight control room, and the following positions are largely unchanged from Shuttle responsibilities: CAPCOM, EECOM, FAO, FDO, Flight, FOD, GC, GNC, INCO, PAO, PROP, RNDZ, Surgeon, and TRAJ.

Some positions were formerly Shuttle back-room positions: Crew Systems, Nav, Pointing, Profile, Timeline, and Weather. The positions newly invented for Starliner are: CDH, FDF, MPO (combining the Shuttle's EGIL and MMACS controllers), Recovery, SDO, and Tablet

Command and Data Handling (CDH)
CDH is responsible for monitoring the health and status of the Starliner avionics systems including the on board computers, display units, keyboards, on board data bus, wireless networks, tablets, on board software, data services for payloads and more.

Crew Systems and Photo/TV
The roles and responsibilities for CREW SYSTEMS include developing operations products supporting crew and cargo integration and being hardware experts for flight crew equipment that deal with crew escape, human habitability, productivity, and well-being. The docking system centerline camera and digital imagery experts from Photo/ TV group will be relied upon for direct mission support and training.

Emergency, Environmental, and Consumables Management (EECOM)
EECOM is responsible for the environmental control and life support systems; monitoring and control of the active thermal control subsystems; atmosphere; suits; consumables management and reporting; cooling services for payloads and ingress/egress support. EECOM leads an integrated team response to emergencies (fire/cabin leak/toxic atmosphere/loss of cooling), and to internal and EECOM system leaks.

Flight Data File (FDF)
FDF manages the development and publication of FDF books for use by the crew and flight controllers. FDF provides real-time support for crew procedures and other FDF related activities. Duties include coordinating technical changes to procedures with flight directors, flight controllers, crew, and international partners. The FDF develops software requirements for procedures tools.

Flight Activities Officer (FAO)
FAO leads the coordination and integration of the crew activities, ground activities and attitude timeline into an integrated flight plan that meets the mission requirements defined by the program. For missions to the International Space Station (ISS), the FAO also works with the ISS Operations Planner to integrate Starliner vehicle operations and preparations into the station timeline during both the joint-mission timeframe and during quiescent operations.

Flight Dynamics Officer (FDO)
FDO is responsible for pre-mission planning and real-time execution of all Starliner trajectory operations, including launch, undocking re-entry and landing.

Ground Control (GC)
The GC team is responsible for the ground systems infrastructure and ground communications necessary to perform planning, training, testing, execution and evaluation of human spaceflight mission operations at the Johnson Space Center Mission Control Center for Boeing CST Mission Operations (MCC-CST).

Guidance, Navigation, and Control (GNC)
GNC manages guidance, navigation and control hardware, and associated software during all phases of flight, including GPS, attitude controllers, the Vision-based Electro-optical Sensor Tracking Assemblies (VESTAs) and more.

Integrated Communications Officer (INCO)
INCO is responsible for monitoring the health and status of the communications avionics including the Space-to-Ground (S/G) and Space-to-Space (S/S) systems, handheld radio communication, command encryption, audio systems and associated loose equipment functionality such as handheld microphones and headsets.

Mechanical and Power Officer (MPO)
MPO is responsible for the Starliner spacecraft electrical, mechanical, structural, and landing and recovery systems. These systems include batteries, solar arrays, power converters, interior lighting, vehicle structure, thermal protection, parachutes, airbags, docking systems, crew hardware and more.

Navigation (NAV)
NAV is responsible for ensuring both the on board and ground segments of the Starliner navigation system is operating properly. NAV monitors performance of the on board navigation hardware and software, sensor status and performance, acceptability of sensor data, navigation convergence, VESTA performance and the VESTA Ground Station. NAV supports the GNC officer for issues related to relative and inertial navigation hardware, and for inertial navigation performance. NAV supports FDO for relative navigation performance monitoring and troubleshooting.

Public Affairs Officer (PAO)
PAO duties will be shared between NASA and Boeing. PAO coordinates news media events between the news media and the crew and/or Mission Control, and provides mission commentary to supplement and explain air-to-ground transmissions and flight control operations to the news media and the public.

Pointing
The Pointing console is responsible the integration of all Starliner Tracking and Data Relay Satellite (TDRS) communication requirements, communication predictions and unique target lines-of-sight analysis for payloads and on board systems. Pointing also provides attitude optimization to support unique pointing requirements, as needed.

Profile
The Profile console monitors the Starliner relative trajectory and translational maneuvers to ensure performance within defined limits. Profile assists in monitoring the progress of crew and automated procedures related to rendezvous and proximity operations. Profile monitors vehicle compliance with applicable flight rules and provides to the Rendezvous position a go/no-go recommendation prior to Authority to Proceed (ATP) points. Profile maintains awareness of potential vehicle automated responses to failure conditions and the resulting abort trajectories.

Propulsion (PROP)
PROP is responsible for all aspects of the operation and management of the propulsion system hardware and software used during all phases of flight. This includes thruster performance and propellant usage, translation burns and attitude control maneuvers, and consumables budgeting, management and reporting.

Recovery
The Recovery position is responsible for planning Starliner recovery and executing recovery operations once the vehicle has landed.

Rendezvous (RNDZ)
The Rendezvous position monitors the Starliner during integrated operations with the space station and ensures that all space station trajectory safety requirements are satisfied. Rendezvous is the primary interface to the space station Visiting Vehicle Officer (VVO) and monitors relative navigation, guidance, and trajectory performance in the proximity operations, docking, separation and flyaround phases of flight.

Starliner Duty Officer (SDO)
For the OFT mission only, the SDO is responsible for monitoring the Starliner while it is docked to the space station in a quiescent configuration while the remainder of the Starliner Flight Control Team is on-call. The SDO is responsible for leading the ground and crew response to Starliner events that result in cautions or warnings on the space station.

Tablet
The Tablet position monitors crew usage of the tablet devices and provides assistance/advice to the crew as needed.

Timeline
The Timeline position assists the FAO in all aspects of preflight mission planning and coordination, and in real-time planning and replanning operations. TIMELINE generates the pre-flight timelines for the flight plan, monitors in-flight crew activities and coordinates activities with other flight controllers.

Trajectory (TRAJ)
TRAJ tracks the spacecraft's position in orbit to support acquisitions, plotting, external notifications, conjunction screening, and debris conjunction message evaluation and notification. TRAJ coordinates trajectory planning and events with the mission planning team, and is the primary member of the team responsible for running the Starliner simulation to accomplish replanning and position update tasks.

Weather
The Weather officer provides weather forecasts and real-time weather observations for launch and landing operations to the mission management community, Flight Director, and flight control team. The Weather officer manages meteorological forecasting models and computer systems that access and assemble radar and satellite imagery, and provides mission-critical inputs to the flight director for go-for-launch and go-for-deorbit decisions.

== Artemis program (2022-present) ==
During the Artemis I mission, these were the teams present in flight control:

Flight Director (Flight)
Leads the team.

Booster Officer (Booster)
Monitors the booster performance.

Command and Data Handling Officer (C&DH)
Monitors the avionics and computer systems.

Control Officer (Control)
Manages guidance and control of the solid rocket boosters, core stage, and ICPS engine from liftoff through the TLI burn.

Emergency, Environmental, and Consumables Officer (EECOM)
Monitors environmental control and life support systems and emergency procedures.

Flight Activities Officer (FAO)
Coordinates the flight plan.

Flight Dynamics Officer (FDO)
Monitors trajectories during all phases of the mission.

Flight Operations Directorate (FOD)
Relays information between the flight control team and relevant managers and leaders within NASA.

Ground Control Officer (GC)
Is responsible for the operation of all mission control systems.

Guidance, Navigation, and Control (GNC)
Operates navigation and flight control software during the mission.

Integrated Communications Officer (INCO)
Monitors all of Orion’s communications systems.

Mechanical and Power Officer (MPO)
Is responsible for electrical, mechanical, structural, and landing and recovery systems.

Propulsion Officer (PROP)
Is responsible for the propulsion systems.

Public Affairs Officer (PAO)
Provides mission commentary to the public and news media.

== See also ==
Former NASA flight controllers

- John Aaron, EECOM
- Steve Bales, GUIDO
- Jay Greene, FDO, Range Safety, Flight Director
- John Hodge, Flight Director
- Christopher C. Kraft, Jr., Flight Director
- Eugene Kranz, Flight Director
- Sy Liebergot, EECOM
- Glynn Lunney, FDO, Flight Director
