= Inco (disambiguation) =

Inco (founded as International Nickel Company) was an American-Canadian mining company that existed from 1902 to 2007.

Inco or INCO may refer to:

- INCO, or integrated communications officer, an Apollo flight control position

== See also ==
- Inco Superstack, a chimney at Inco's Copper Cliff facility near Sudbury, Ontario, Canada
- Operation Inco I, an intelligence operation during World War I carried out by the Netherlands East Indies Forces Intelligence Service
