= Failure is not an option =

Phrase associated with Gene Kranz

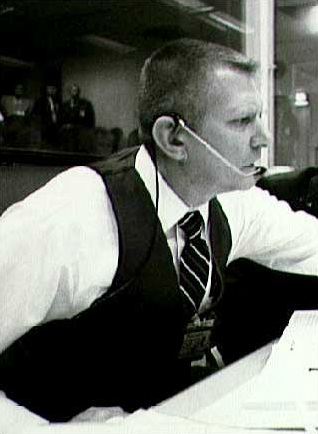
- Kranz in an undated photograph at the Christopher C. Kraft Jr. Mission Control Center
- Character: Gene Kranz
- Actor: Ed Harris
- Written by: William Broyles Jr. Al Reinert
- First used in: Apollo 13

"Failure is not an option" is a phrase associated with NASA Flight Director Gene Kranz and the Apollo 13 Moon landing mission. Although Kranz is often attributed with having spoken those words during the mission, he did not actually say the phrase. The origin of the phrase is from the preparation for the 1995 film Apollo 13 according to FIDO Flight Controller Jerry Bostick:

In preparation for the movie, the script writers, Al Reinert and Bill Broyles, came down to Clear Lake to interview me on "What are the people in Mission Control really like?" One of their questions was "Weren't there times when everybody, or at least a few people, just panicked?" My answer was "No, when bad things happened, we just calmly laid out all the options, and failure was not one of them." ... I immediately sensed that Bill Broyles wanted to leave and assumed that he was bored with the interview. Only months later did I learn that when they got in their car to leave, he started screaming, "That's it! That's the tag line for the whole movie, Failure is not an option."

== Film ==
Failure is not an option is the tag line of the 1995 film Apollo 13. It is spoken in the film by Ed Harris, who portrayed Gene Kranz, and said

We've never lost an American in space; we're sure as hell not going to lose one on my watch! Failure is not an option.

== Gene Kranz autobiography ==
Gene Kranz titled his 2000 memoir Failure Is Not An Option. Kranz chose the line as the title because he liked the way it reflected the attitude of mission control. In the book, he states that it was

a creed that we [NASA's Mission Control Center] all lived by: "Failure is not an option".

== History Channel documentary ==
Failure Is Not an Option is also a presentation on the History Channel documenting the United States' space program with insights from the flight engineers, project managers, flight controllers, astronauts, and others involved inside the National Aeronautics and Space Administration. Speakers include Chris Kraft, Gene Kranz, Jim Lovell, Jerry Bostick, Ed Fendell, Gene Cernan, John Llewellyn, John Aaron, Glynn Lunney, Wally Schirra, and Gerry Griffin. It takes the viewer from the Launch of Sputnik through the Moon missions. It was produced in 2003.

From the History Channel website:

Failure Is Not An Option tells the story of the men and women behind the space program – the men and women of mission control.

see full quote
