= Milton Windler =

American flight director (1932–2026)

Milt Windler
- Born: Milton Windler; January 10, 1932; Hampton, Virginia, U.S.
- Died: October 1, 2026 (aged 94)
- Education: Virginia Tech
- Occupation: Flight director
- Employer: NASA
- Children: 3
- Honours: Presidential Medal of Freedom

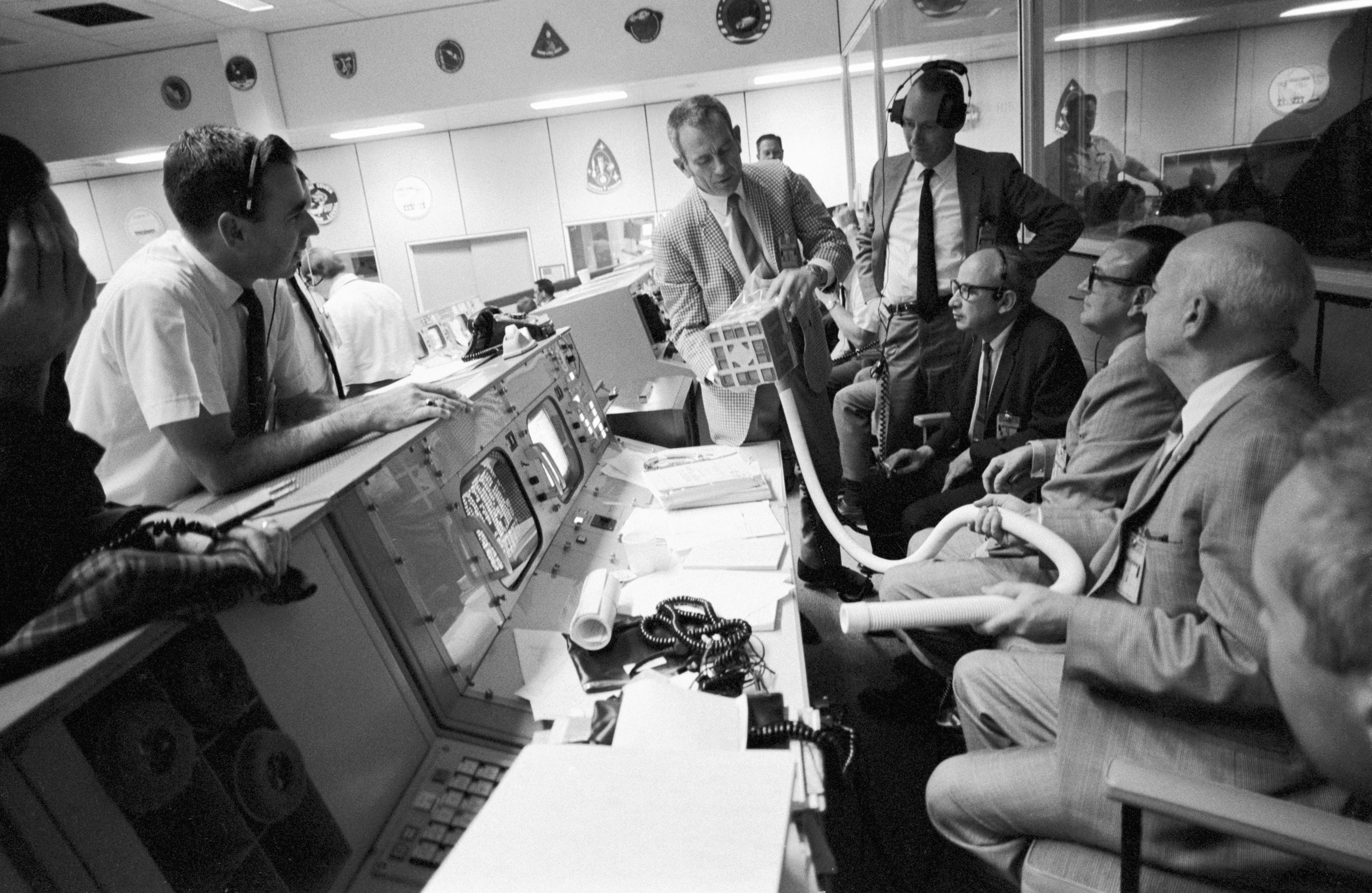
Milt Windler (white shirt, at left) and other NASA leaders observe Deke Slayton holding the adapter improvised to scrub carbon dioxide from Apollo 13.

Milton Windler (January 10, 1932 – October 1, 2026) was an American NASA flight director. He is best known for his work as one of the four flight directors of Apollo 13 Mission Operations Team, all of whom were awarded the Presidential Medal of Freedom by president Richard M. Nixon for their work in guiding the crippled spacecraft safely back to Earth.

== Life and carer ==
Milton Windler was born in Hampton, Virginia, on January 10, 1932. Windler graduated from Virginia Tech in 1954 with a degree in aeronautical engineering. While at Virginia Tech, Windler joined the U.S. Air Force Reserve Officers' Training Corps. After graduating, he worked at the National Advisory Committee for Aeronautics (NACA). He then joined the Air Force, working as a jet fighter pilot. After four years, he rejoined NACA at the Langley Research Center in Virginia. He then relocated to the Manned Spacecraft Center in Houston, Texas.

He began working at NASA in 1959 during Project Mercury. Originally working in the recovery division, he was promoted to flight director in 1968 by Chris Kraft to support Eugene Kranz, who had acquired additional responsibilities in the months following the Apollo 1 fire. Windler was a member of Apollo 13 Mission Control. Windler was awarded the Presidential Medal of Freedom by president Richard Nixon in 1970 for his work on Apollo 13. Windler also served as flight director for Apollo 8, Apollo 10, Apollo 11, Apollo 14, Apollo 15, and all three Skylab missions. Following the conclusion of the Apollo Program, Windler worked in the Space Shuttle Project Office on Remote Manipulator Systems Operations until 1978. He was a recipient of the NASA Exceptional Service Medal.

Windler had three children with his wife, Betty. He died on October 1, 2026, at the age of 94.

== Sources ==
- Kranz, Gene (2000). Failure is not an option: mission control from Mercury to Apollo 13 and beyond. New York: Simon & Schuster. ISBN 978-0-7432-0079-0.
