= Operation Inco I =

World War II operation

Operation Inco I was a World War II operation by the Netherlands East Indies Forces Intelligence Service on the island of Java. On 7 July 1945, the Dutch submarine HNLMS K XV landed personnel and supplies of the shore party Inco I at six different places on the coast of the Damar islands.
