= Gerald D. Griffin =

American aerospace engineer and businessman (born 1934)

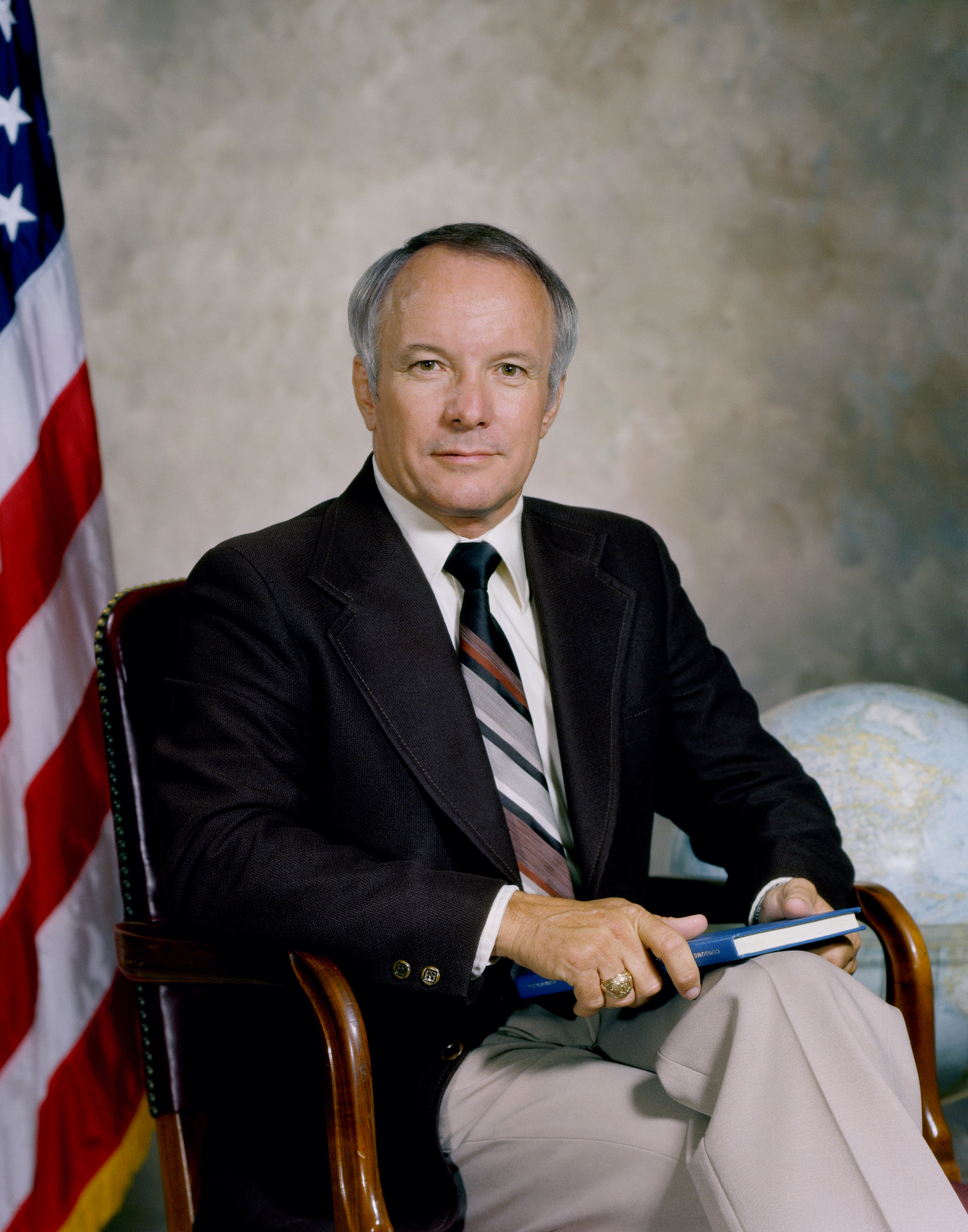
- Griffin in 1982
- Born: December 25, 1934 (age 91); Athens, Texas, U.S.
- Education: Texas A&M University (B.S.)
- Occupations: Flight director during Apollo era; 1982–1986 director of Johnson Space Center
- Employer: NASA
- Known for: Mission director for Human Space Flight; portraying similar roles in several major films and providing technical support or narration for television documentaries
- Spouse: Sandra "Sandy" Huber Griffin
- Children: Kirk (b. 1959), Gwen (b. 1963)

Gerald D. Griffin (born December 25, 1934) is an American aeronautical engineer and former NASA official, who served as a flight director during the Apollo program and director of Johnson Space Center, succeeding Chris Kraft in 1982.

When Griffin was nine years old his family moved to Fort Worth, Texas. Upon graduation from Texas A&M he was commissioned as an officer in the United States Air Force. He served four years on active duty, first in flight training, then flying as a weapon systems officer in jet fighter-interceptors. In 1960 Griffin left active duty and began his space career as a systems engineer/flight controller at the USAF Satellite Test Center in Sunnyvale, California.

In 1964 Griffin joined NASA in Houston as a flight controller in Mission Control, specializing in guidance, navigation and control systems during Project Gemini. In 1968 he was named a Mission Control flight director and served in that role for all of the Apollo Program crewed missions, including all nine crewed missions out to the Moon, six of which included lunar landings. Griffin's "Gold" team conducted half of the lunar landings made during Apollo: Apollos 14, 15, 16, and 17. His team was scheduled to conduct the landing of Apollo 13, but when the landing was cancelled as a result of the oxygen tank explosion, his team played a key role in the safe return of the astronauts.

After the Apollo Program was completed Griffin served in other roles at NASA, first in multiple positions at NASA Headquarters in Washington, D.C., then as the deputy director of the Dryden (now Armstrong) Flight Research Center in California, then as deputy director of the Kennedy Space Center in Florida. In 1982 he returned to Houston as director of the Johnson Space Center.

After taking early retirement from NASA in 1986, Griffin became a senior executive with several non-space, as well as space-related, companies and organizations in the private sector. Today Griffin remains active in several businesses at the senior level. He also is a technical and management consultant for a broad range of clients.

Because of his real-life role as a flight director during the troubled flight of Apollo 13, Griffin was a technical advisor for the 1995 film Apollo 13. Later he was a technical advisor and also acted in the films Contact (1997) and Deep Impact (1998), and was the technical advisor for the 2011 film Apollo 18. He is a member of the Screen Actors Guild. Griffin was played by actor David Clyde Carr in the 1998 HBO miniseries From the Earth to the Moon.

Griffin is an active general aviation pilot and aircraft owner, holding a commercial license with an instrument rating for single-engine aircraft, multi-engine aircraft and helicopters.

== Early life and education ==
Gerry and his twin brother, Richard L. "Larry" Griffin, were born on December 25, 1934, in Athens, Texas to parents Herschel Hayden Griffin (1903–1989) and Helen Elizabeth Boswell Griffin (1904–1947). The twins also had an older brother, Kenneth H. "Ken" Griffin (1925–2003). The family moved to Fort Worth, Texas in 1944, and Gerry graduated from Arlington Heights High School in 1952. While in high school Gerry continued his activities in the Boy Scouts of America and earned the rank of Eagle Scout in 1951 at the age of 16. In junior high school and high school Gerry also began his long association with the military through the Junior Reserve Officer Training Corps (JROTC), then the Reserve Officer Training Corps (ROTC).

In the fall of 1952 Griffin entered the Agricultural and Mechanical College of Texas, now Texas A&M University, to study aeronautical engineering. He was a member of the famed Texas A&M Corps of Cadets for four years and was commissioned as a second lieutenant in the United States Air Force (USAF) upon graduation in 1956 with a Bachelor of Science degree. After graduation Griffin went to work for Douglas Aircraft Company in Long Beach, California, prior to being called to active duty by the USAF.

== Military duty ==
=== USAF training ===
==== Pre-flight ====
The USAF ordered Griffin to report for active duty on December 7, 1956, at Lackland Air Force Base in San Antonio, Texas. This was a 30-day "Pre-Flight" period which included physical and psychological exams, orientation courses, drill, physical training, ejection seat training, etc.

==== Primary-Basic Navigator Course ====
At the end of pre-flight Griffin was ordered to Harlingen Air Force Base in Harlingen, Texas where he would undergo one year of primary and basic navigation training. This was one year of intense ground school and inflight aircraft training in the Convair T-29. All phases of day and night navigation were covered including dead reckoning, celestial, radio, and radar. In December 1957 Griffin was awarded his USAF Navigator Wings.

==== Radar Fighter Interceptor Course ====
Griffin chose the fighter interceptor path in order to eventually be able to fly in high-performance supersonic jet fighters. This advanced training was at James Connally Air Force Base in Waco, Texas and was six months in duration. Again, intense ground school was accompanied by inflight day and night intercept training, first in the North American B-25 Mitchell, then in the Northrop F-89D Scorpion. Griffin finished second in his class and was able to select the operational assignment he wanted: the 84th Fighter Interceptor Squadron (FIS) at Hamilton Air Force Base in Marin County, California.

=== USAF operations ===
==== 84th FIS, Hamilton Air Force Base, California ====
The 84th FIS was a fighter squadron in the USAF Air Defense Command. Griffin arrived at the 84th FIS in June 1958 to serve as a Weapons Systems Officer, flying first in the Northrop F-89J Scorpion, a subsonic air defense fighter, and then in the McDonnell F-101B Voodoo a supersonic air defense fighter. Both aircraft carried two MB-1 Genie nuclear air-to-air missiles with 3.5 kiloton warheads. Both aircraft also carried two Hughes Falcon infrared heat-seeking missiles with high-explosive warheads. In 1960, while still serving in the 84th FIS, Griffin, on his own and in his spare time, began his general aviation career as a pilot by taking flying lessons at a local airport in nearby Novato, California. Griffin served in the 84th FIS for two and a half years before leaving active duty on December 26, 1960, at the rank of first lieutenant. Griffin remained in the USAF Active Reserve until 1964 attaining the rank of captain. He was then assigned to the USAF Inactive Reserve until 1974, when he was retired officially from the USAF Reserve. During four years on active duty and four years in the active reserve Griffin logged over 800 hours of military flight time.

== Pre-NASA space career ==
=== Lockheed Missile and Space Company (LMSC) ===
Immediately after leaving USAF active duty Griffin joined LMSC in January 1961 as a Missile Systems Engineer at the USAF Satellite Test Center (STC) in Sunnyvale, California. LMSC was the prime contractor for flight operations in the STC which controlled USAF satellites launched into polar orbit from Vandenberg AFB, California. This was the era of the early reconnaissance (spy) satellites with names such as Discoverer, MIDAS and SAMOS. This was Griffin's first experience as a real-time flight controller during launch, orbit, and entry of space vehicles. He performed systems analysis of the satellites and the Agena upper stage used on the Thor and Atlas launch vehicles. Griffin's primary areas of specialty were guidance, control and propulsion systems.

=== General Dynamics/Fort Worth (GD/FW) ===
In 1962 Griffin left LMSC after two years to return to his native Texas and became a Senior Aerosystems Engineer at GD/FW in Fort Worth, Texas. GD/FW, a long-time designer and developer of aircraft, was venturing into space systems studies and, hopefully, space hardware development in the future. Griffin was brought in to help in the space effort, but from the beginning he was involved in research and engineering tasks involving aircraft and spacecraft guidance and control systems for NASA and USAF customers.

From May 5, 1961, the day astronaut Al Shepard rode the Freedom 7 spacecraft in a suborbital flight down the Atlantic Ocean from Cape Canaveral, Griffin's desire was to work at NASA as a flight controller in Mission Control.

== NASA career ==
=== NASA Manned Spacecraft Center ===
==== Project Gemini ====
In June 1964 Griffin went to work at the Manned Spacecraft Center (renamed Lyndon B. Johnson Space Center in 1973). Project Mercury had recently ended and Project Gemini was just beginning. The USAF Agena was to be used as a rendezvous and docking target for the Gemini, and because of his background with the Agena Griffin was hired as an Agena flight controller. However, the second (and final) uncrewed test flight of the Gemini-Titan was about to take place at Cape Canaveral, and Griffin was diverted to become a Gemini flight controller in the position of "GNC": Guidance, Navigation & Control. He served as a GNC flight controller throughout the Gemini program, specializing in guidance, navigation, control and propulsion systems. At the completion of Project Gemini he was preparing for a similar role for the Apollo program when the Apollo 1 fire occurred.

==== Apollo Program ====
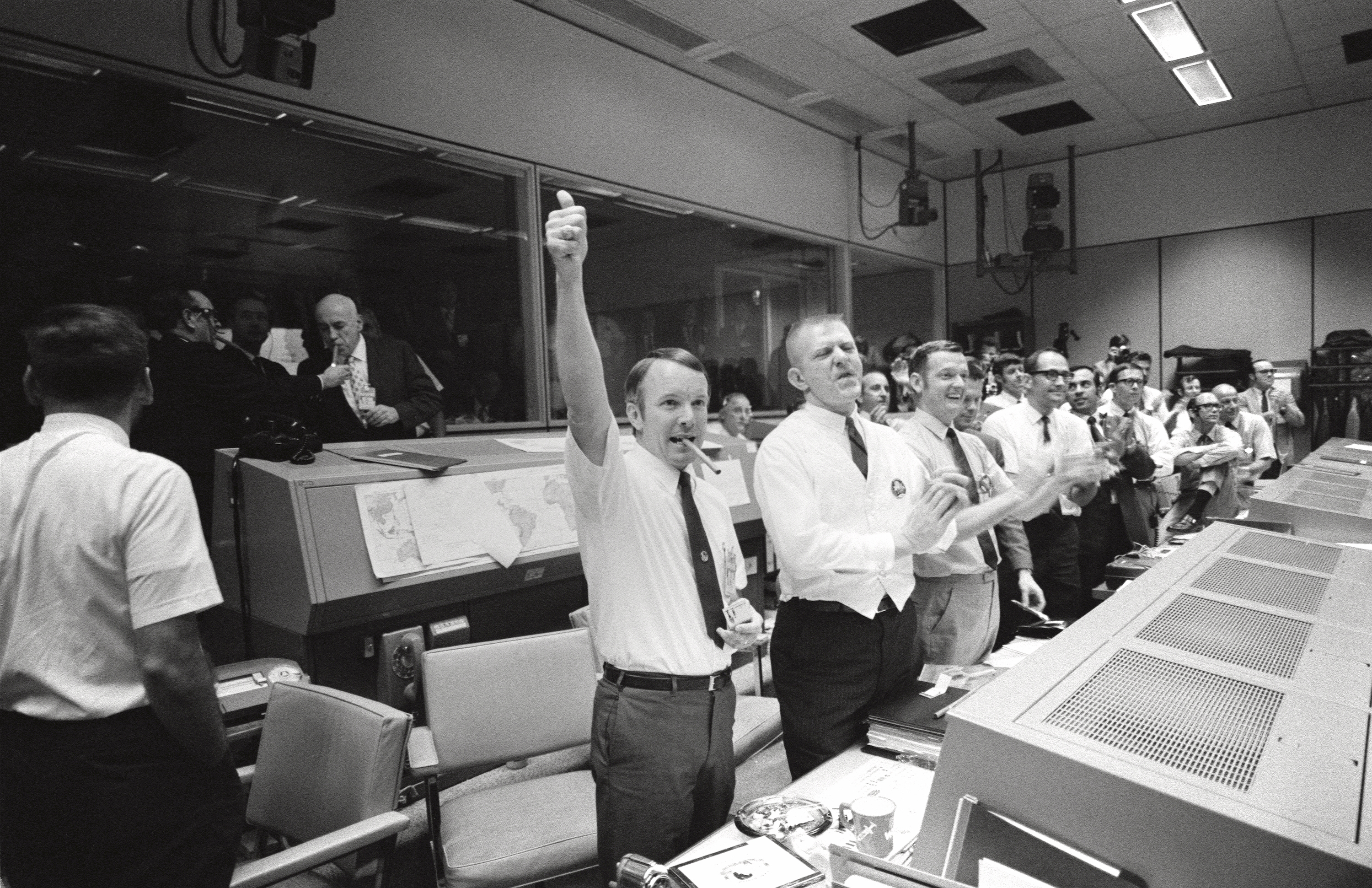
Griffin (l) and other flight directors celebrate the Apollo 13 splashdown April 17, 1970

As a result of the Apollo 1 fire the Apollo mission schedule was delayed for 21 months. During the delay Griffin was named an Apollo flight director and served in that role for all of the Apollo Program crewed missions. Griffin was lead flight director for three lunar missions: Apollo 12, Apollo 15, and Apollo 17. Griffin's "Gold" team controlled two Earth launches (Apollo 12 and Apollo 15), and half of Apollo's six lunar landings (Apollo 14, 16, and 17). His team was scheduled to conduct the landing of Apollo 13, but when the landing was canceled as a result of the oxygen tank explosion, his team played a key role in the safe return of the astronauts.

=== NASA Headquarters ===
==== Assistant Administrator for Legislative Affairs ====
Griffin was responsible for coordinating and orchestrating all NASA liaison activities with Congress. He served as the principal advisor to the Administrator and other NASA officials on matters involving relations with Congress as well as state and local governments.

==== Deputy Associate Administrator for Space Flight (Operations) ====
Griffin was responsible for early Space Transportation Systems (STS) operations planning, the development of user policies, and the establishment of pricing policies. These initial STS operational concepts were incorporated in overall Agency planning for the Shuttle era and became the foundation for later STS operations.

=== NASA Dryden Flight Research Center ===
==== Deputy director ====
Griffin served as "general manager" of the NASA center responsible for aircraft flight research programs involving a wide variety of aeronautical and space technology. Major efforts involved the flight testing of high-speed aircraft and preparations for the Shuttle Approach and Landing Test Program. In addition to general management functions, his specific duties required a strong interface with USAF flight research/test activities.

=== NASA Kennedy Space Center ===
==== Deputy director ====
Griffin served as the "general manager" of NASA's center for launch operations for uncrewed and crewed systems. KSC was a 140,000-acre installation with an original plant value of $1.8 billion, a workforce of 2,200 civil servants and 10,000 support contractors and an annual budget of $550 million. During this period KSC was the launch site for the uncrewed Delta and Atlas-Centaur launch vehicles and the April 1981 first launch of the Space Shuttle.

=== Scott Science & Technology, Inc. ===
==== Vice president ====
Griffin had responsibility for systems engineering and general management functions of the company, a small R&D organization involved in high-technology products manufacturing and testing, research studies, management systems consultation and classified support contact work for the Department of Defense crewed space flight activities.

=== NASA Johnson Space Center ===
==== Director ====
Griffin was responsible for NASA's prime center for crewed space flight R&D and operations. The workforce included 3,200 civil servants and 10,000 support contractors. He was responsible for a budget of $1.5 billion per year and a diverse array of unique facilities. Griffin led the successful effort to bring the full Shuttle capability to operational status and played a key role in securing approval for the development of the International Space Station.

== Private sector career ==
=== Greater Houston Chamber of Commerce ===
==== President and CEO ====
Griffin was responsible for the total operation of the Greater Houston Chamber of Commerce, one of the largest chambers of commerce in the United States. His duties included external and internal functions. External functions included developing and executing a board-approved program of work aimed at regional improvements and economic development. Internal functions included budget planning and control, membership development and staffing.

=== Korn Ferry International ===
==== Managing director, Houston Office ====
Griffin was responsible for leading and directing the operation of the Houston office of Korn/Ferry International. He conducted searches in a general practice and, on a firm wide basis, specialized in searches for the aerospace, defense and other technology intensive industries.

=== Comarco, Inc ===
==== Chairman of the board ====
Griffin joined the board of Comarco as a director in April 1986 and, in August 1988, was named chairman of the board. Comarco was a publicly owned company traded on the NASDAQ exchange and had sales of approximately $55 million per year. Comarco was a leading provider of advanced technology tools and engineering services to the wireless communications industry. Comarco also designed and manufactured mobile power products for wireless devices.

=== Korn Ferry International ===
==== Senior consultant ====
As a senior consultant with Korn/Ferry International, Griffin assists the firm in recruiting assignments for senior-level executives, especially for clients in technology-intensive industries and organizations. He is the former managing director of Korn/Ferry's Houston office.

=== GDG Consulting ===
==== Owner and principal ====
Griffin currently provides technical and management consulting services for a broad range of clients.

=== KLG Contracting, Inc ===
==== Owner and president ====
KLG Contracting, Inc., an S-corporation, provides general contracting, site preparation, and construction services for private home and other building projects.

=== Golden Spike Company ===
==== Chairman of the board ====
Griffin is chairman of the board of the Golden Spike Company (GSC), a Delaware Corporation headquartered in Boulder, Colorado. GSC is early-stage commercial space company whose long-term goal is to develop and operate capabilities in space infrastructure for travel and exploration in and beyond low Earth orbit.

== Motion picture and other media activities ==
=== Motion pictures ===
- 1995 Apollo 13 (Technical Consultant)
- 1997 Contact (Technical Consultant and actor)
- 1998 Deep Impact (Technical Advisor and actor)
- 2011 Apollo 18 (Technical Advisor/Consultant)

=== Other media ===
- 1986 Today on January 29, 1986 (TV Series)
- 1994 Houston, We've Got a Problem (documentary short)
- 1995 Apollo 13: For the Record (documentary)
- 1996 Lost Moon: The Triumph of Apollo 13 (video documentary)
- 2003 Failure Is Not an Option (TV Movie documentary)
- 2005 Beyond the Moon: Failure Is Not an Option 2 (TV movie documentary)
- 2017 Mission Control: The Unsung Heroes of Apollo (Movie/Video documentary)

== General aviation ==
=== Pilot courses completed ===
- Private Pilot Course, FAA, 1964
- Commercial Pilot Course, FAA, 1971
- Instrument Pilot Course, FAA, 1971
- Multi Engine Pilot Course, FAA, 1971
- Helicopter Pilot Course, FAA, 1974

=== Certificate and ratings held ===
- Commercial Pilot
  - Airplane Single and Multi Engine Land
  - Instrument Airplane
  - Rotorcraft-Helicopter

=== National Aeronautic Association and Federation Aeronautique Internationale records ===
- World Speed Record, Houston to Denver, Aircraft Class C-1b, PA-18A Super Cub N1937G, 7:45:47, May 30, 1987
  - Larry Griffin, Pilot
  - Gerry Griffin, Pilot
- World Speed Record, Houston to Dallas, Aircraft Class C-1b, PA-18A Super Cub N1937G, 1:59:52, May 17, 1991
  - Gerry Griffin, Pilot
  - Larry Griffin, Pilot

(Aircraft Class C-1b is an aircraft with a gross weight of 500–1,000 kg (1,100–2,200 lb) and powered by a piston engine)

=== PA-18A Super Cub N1937G ===
N1937G was originally manufactured in 1959 and used periodically as a crop duster. The aircraft was purchased by Larry and Gerry Griffin in 1985. They had the aircraft completely rebuilt including the installation of a modified Lycoming O-360 engine which produces 200 horsepower, a constant speed propeller, and long range fuel tanks. The reconstruction was completed in 1989.

== Current affiliations ==
- Trustee, Schreiner University, Kerrville, Texas
- Ambassador and past chair, 12th Man Foundation, Texas A&M University
- Member, board of advisors, Rotary National Award for Space Achievement Foundation
- Director, NASA Alumni League, Washington, DC
- Founding member, Texas Coalition for Excellence in Higher Education
- Member, advisory board, Texas A&M Engineering Experiment Station (TEES)
- Member, technology advisory board, Runway Capital Partners
- Member, board of advisors, AlphaSpace LLC, Houston, Texas

== Past affiliations ==
- Founding director and organizer, Bank of the Hills, Kerrville, Texas
- Member, board of advisors, Coalition for Space Exploration
- Member, board of advisors, MEI Technologies, Inc., Houston, Texas
- Member, Council for Continuous Improvement and Innovation in Texas Higher Education
- Director, Comarco, Incorporated, Lake Forest, California
- Advisor, Astrolabe Ventures, Palo Alto, California
- Trustee, Universities Space Research Association, Columbia, Maryland
- Member, Texas Higher Education Coordinating Board, Austin, Texas
- Member, Upper Guadalupe River Authority, Kerrville, Texas
- Board of Advisors, COM-NET Ericsson, Incorporated, Lynchburg, Virginia
- Commissioner, Texas National Research Laboratory Commission
- Commissioner, Texas Space Science Industry Commission
- Member, Space Research and Technology Advisory Board, Texas A&M University
- Member, executive advisory board, College of Business Administration, University of Houston
- Member, development board, University of Houston System
- Member, Institutional Advancement Council, University of Houston-Downtown
- Member, International Academy of Astronautics
- Member, executive committee, Wings Over Houston Airshow
- President, The 12th Man Foundation, Texas A&M University
- Director, Texas A&M University Corps of Cadets Development Council Board
- Member, Corps of Cadets Development Council, Texas A&M University
- Director, General Space Corporation, Pittsburgh, Pennsylvania
- Senior fellow, Eaker Institute of Aerospace Studies
- Advisory director, ECI Building Components, Inc., Houston, Texas
- Director, NCNB Texas, Nassau Bay Bank, Houston, Texas
- Director, American Chamber of Commerce Executives, Arlington, Virginia
- Director (Ex-Officio), Texas Medical Center, Houston, Texas
- Director, Greater Houston Community Foundation, Houston, Texas
- Director, Central Houston, Inc
- Governor, The Forum Club of Houston
- Director, Houston Business Council, Inc
- Director, Houston World Trade Association
- Director, Houston International Protocol Alliance
- Director, Business Volunteers for the Arts
- Director, Institute of International Education, Houston, Texas
- Director, Sisters of Charity of the Incarnate Word Hospitals, Houston, Texas
- Director, The Space Foundation, Houston, Texas
- Director, Hill Country Arts Foundation
- Director, Challenger Center for Space Science Education, Washington, DC
- Trustee, Challenger Benefit Fund, Houston, Texas
- Director, executive board, Sam Houston Area Council, Boy Scouts of America, Houston, Texas
- Director, YMCA of the Greater Houston Area, Houston, Texas

== Honors and awards ==
- Presidential Medal of Freedom, The Apollo XIII Mission Operations Team, 1970
- Exceptional Service Medal, NASA, 1970
- Exceptional Service Medal, NASA, 1971
- Creative Management Award, NASA, 1974
- Old Master Award, Purdue University, 1978
- Eminent Engineer, Tau Beta Pi, 1979
- Meritorious Senior Executive, Presidential Rank, 1980
- Outstanding Leadership Medal, NASA, 1981
- Alumni Honor Award, College of Engineering, Texas A&M University, 1983
- Honorary Doctor of Humane Letters, University of Houston Clear Lake, 1984
- Distinguished Senior Executive, Presidential Rank, NASA, 1985
- Distinguished Alumnus, Texas A&M University, 1985
- Distinguished Service Medal, NASA, 1986
- Distinguished Leadership Award, School of Business and Public Administration, University of Houston Clear Lake, 1986
- Houston Outstanding Aggie, 1987
- Texas A&M Muster Speaker, Main Campus, Texas A&M University, 1988
- Manager of the Year, National Management Association, Gulf Coast Council, 1988
- Corps of Cadets Hall of Honor, Texas A&M University, 1996
- Member, International Air & Space Hall of Fame, San Diego Air & Space Museum, 2013
- Distinguished Alumnus, Aerospace Engineering Department, Texas A&M University, 2014
- Namesake, Texas A&M University Fish Camp, Texas A&M University, 2014
- Apollo Celebration Pioneer Award, 2018
- FAA Wright Brothers Master Pilot Award, 2025
- Distinguished Alumni, Tau Beta Pi, 2026

== Professional organizations ==
- Fellow, American Institute of Aeronautics and Astronautics
- Fellow, American Astronautical Society
- Member, Experimental Aircraft Association
- Member, National Aeronautic Association
- Member, Aircraft Owners and Pilots Association
- Member, Screen Actors Guild

== Publications ==
- Gerald D. Griffin, chairman, Report on "White House Study on Government Procurement Practices for Research and Development Activities", 1979
- Gerald D. Griffin, "Commercial Use of Space – The Space Business Era", U.S. Space Technology Conference, Zurich, Switzerland, June 19–21, 1984.
- G.D. Griffin, "Mechanical Engineering Aspects of the Space Shuttle Orbiter – Design, Manufacture and Operation", Institution of Mechanical Engineers, London, England, September 13, 1984.
- G.D. Griffin, "Contractors and Government: Teamwork and Commitment", NASA Symposium on Productivity and Quality, Washington, DC, September 25–26, 1984
- Gerald D. Griffin, "Space Commercialization and Industry", United States Space Foundation 1st Annual Space Symposium, Colorado Springs, Colorado, November 26–28, 1984.
- Gerald D. Griffin, "Industry Opportunities in the Space Station Era", Canadian Space Business Opportunities Conference, Toronto, Canada, April 24–25, 1985.
- Gerald D. Griffin, "NASA and the Department of Defense in Space", Air Force War College, Maxwell Air Force Base, Alabama, May 7, 1985.
- Gerald D. Griffin, "Current Status and Future Evolution of the Space Transportation System", Subcommittee on Space Science and Applications, Committee on Science and Technology, U.S. House of Representatives, Washington, DC, June 1985.
- Gerald D. Griffin, "Challenges for the NASA/Contractor/University Team", Conference on R&D Productivity: New Challenges for the U.S. Space Program, Houston, Texas, September 10–11, 1985.
- Gerald D. Griffin, "The Shuttle – The Space Station – And Beyond", AIAA Shuttle Environment and Operations II Conference, Houston, Texas November 13–15, 1985.
- Gerry Griffin, "New Technology = New Business", Business Forum, Abilene Christian University, Abilene, Texas, April 9, 1986
- Gerald D. Griffin, "Space – Where are We Going?", Armed Forces Communications and Electronics Association Symposium on Space Command, Control and Communications (C3), Colorado Springs, Colorado, August 6, 1986.
- Gerry Griffin, "Building Commercial Space Industries", Conference on Commercial Opportunities from Space Transport & Related Industries, Brisbane, Australia, April 26–28, 1988.
- Gerald D. Griffin, "Improving the Business Climate – Space Technology as an Engine of Economic Growth", Arizona Looks to the Future: Space, Technology and the Economy Conference, Tucson, Arizona, October 23, 1989.
- Gerry Griffin, "The Apollo Missions – A Perspective of Then & Now", Young Pharmacists Group 10th Annual Conference, Birmingham, England, October 20–22, 1995.
- Gerry Griffin, "NASA's Most Important Asset – Its People", NASA Alumni League News, Vol. 7, No. 2, Winter 1996.
- Gerry Griffin, "Space and e-Business: Both Full of Challenges", British Telecom Europe Annual Conference, Barcelona, Spain, January 27, 2000.
- Gerry Griffin, "Getting the Difficult Job Done", DaimlerChrysler Project Management Conference, Lansing, Michigan, June 2, 2003.
- Gerry Griffin, "The Foundations and Operating Principles of Mission Control: A Roadmap to Success", Banca Mediolanum Annual Convention, Rimini, Italy, March 4, 2005.
- Gerry Griffin, "A Key Step for America: Ares 1-X Flight a New Chapter in Human Spaceflight", Op-Ed, Florida Today, November 7, 2009.
- Gerry Griffin, "Situational Awareness in Human Space Flight-Lessons Learned", Bombardier Safety Standdown, Wichita, Kansas, October 6, 2010.
- Gerry Griffin, "Crew-Ground Integration in Piloted Space Programs", HCI-Aero 2010 Conference, Cape Canaveral, Florida, November 3, 2010.
- Gerry Griffin, "U.S. Mustn't Give Up on Space", Op-Ed, USA Today, April 5, 2011
- Gerald D. Griffin, "Testimony before the Joint Legislative Committee on Oversight of Higher Education, Governance & Transparency", Texas Legislature, Austin, Texas, September 21, 2011
- Gerry Griffin & S. Alan Stern, "U.S. Needs Near-term Results in Human Space Exploration", Op-Ed, Space News, September 24, 2011
