= Gene Kranz =

American flight director for NASA (born 1933)

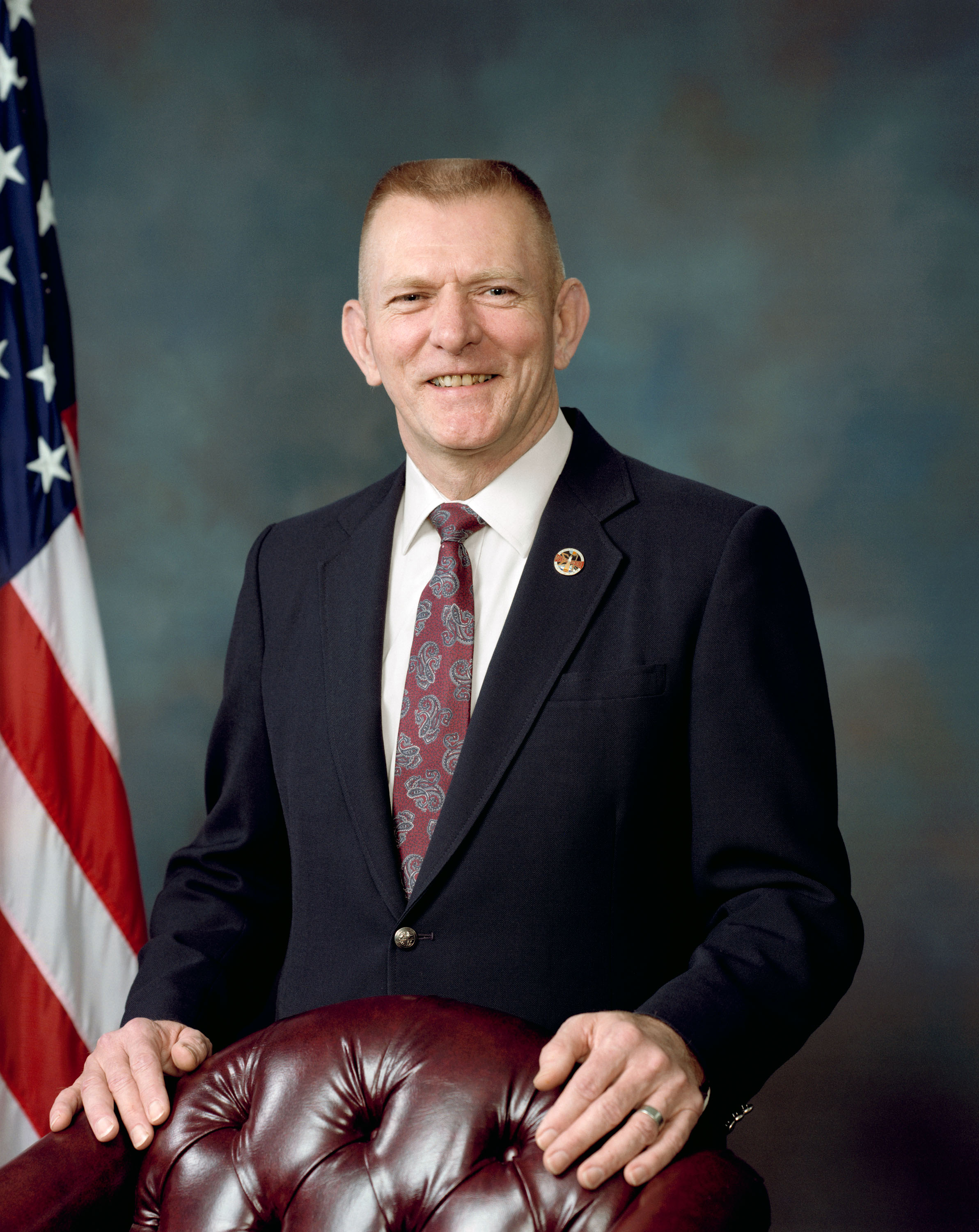
- Official portrait
- Born: Eugene Francis Kranz; August 17, 1933 (age 93); Toledo, Ohio, U.S.
- Education: Saint Louis University's Parks College of Engineering, Aviation and Technology, BS 1954
- Occupations: Flight director during Gemini and Apollo programs; Director of NASA Mission Operations
- Years active: 1960–1994
- Employer: NASA (Retired)
- Known for: Lead flight director during Apollo 13, Apollo 15 and Apollo 17; Flight Director during first lunar landing (Apollo 11)
- Predecessor: Chris Kraft (first Lead Flight Director)
- Spouse: Marta Cadena
- Children: 6
- Parent: Leo Peter Kranz (father)
- Awards: Presidential Medal of Freedom; NASA Distinguished Service Medal; NASA Outstanding Leadership Medal; NASA Exceptional Service Medal

Signature
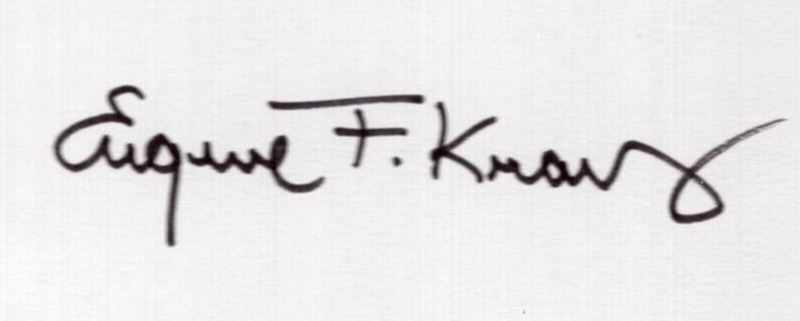

Eugene Francis Kranz (born August 17, 1933) is an American aerospace engineer who served as NASA's second Chief Flight Director, directing missions of the Mercury, Gemini, and Apollo programs, including the first lunar landing mission, Apollo 11. He directed the successful efforts by the Mission Control team to save the crew of Apollo 13. He was known for his close-cut flattop hairstyle and the dapper vests of different styles and materials made by his wife, Marta Kranz, for his Flight Director missions.

Kranz coined the phrase "tough and competent", which became known as the "Kranz Dictum". Kranz has been the subject of movies, documentary films, books, and periodical articles. Kranz is a recipient of a Presidential Medal of Freedom. In a 2010 Space Foundation survey, Kranz was ranked as the second most popular space hero after Neil Armstrong.

== Early years ==
Kranz was born August 17, 1933, in Toledo, Ohio, and attended Central Catholic High School. He grew up on a farm that overlooked the Willys-Overland Jeep production plant. His father, Leo Peter Kranz, was the son of German immigrants, and served as an Army medic during World War I. His father died in 1940, when Eugene was only seven years old. Kranz has two older sisters, Louise and Helen.

Kranz was interested in space at a young age; in high school he wrote a thesis on the topic of a single-stage (SSTO) rocket to the Moon. The thesis was titled The Design and Possibilities of the Interplanetary Rocket. Following his high school graduation in 1951, Kranz went to college. He graduated with a Bachelor of Science degree in Aeronautical Engineering from Saint Louis University's Parks College of Engineering, Aviation and Technology in 1954. He received his commission as a second lieutenant in the U.S. Air Force Reserve, completing pilot training at Lackland Air Force Base in Texas in 1955. Shortly after receiving his wings, Kranz married Marta Cadena, a daughter of Mexican immigrants who fled from Mexico during the Mexican Revolution. Kranz was sent to South Korea to fly the F-86 Sabre aircraft for patrol operations around the Korean DMZ.

After finishing his tour in Korea, Kranz left the Air Force and went to work for McDonnell Aircraft Corporation, where he assisted with the research and testing of new Surface-to-Air (SAM) and Air-to-Ground missiles for the U.S. Air Force at its Research Center at Holloman Air Force Base. He was discharged from the Air Force Reserve as a Captain in 1972.

== NASA career ==
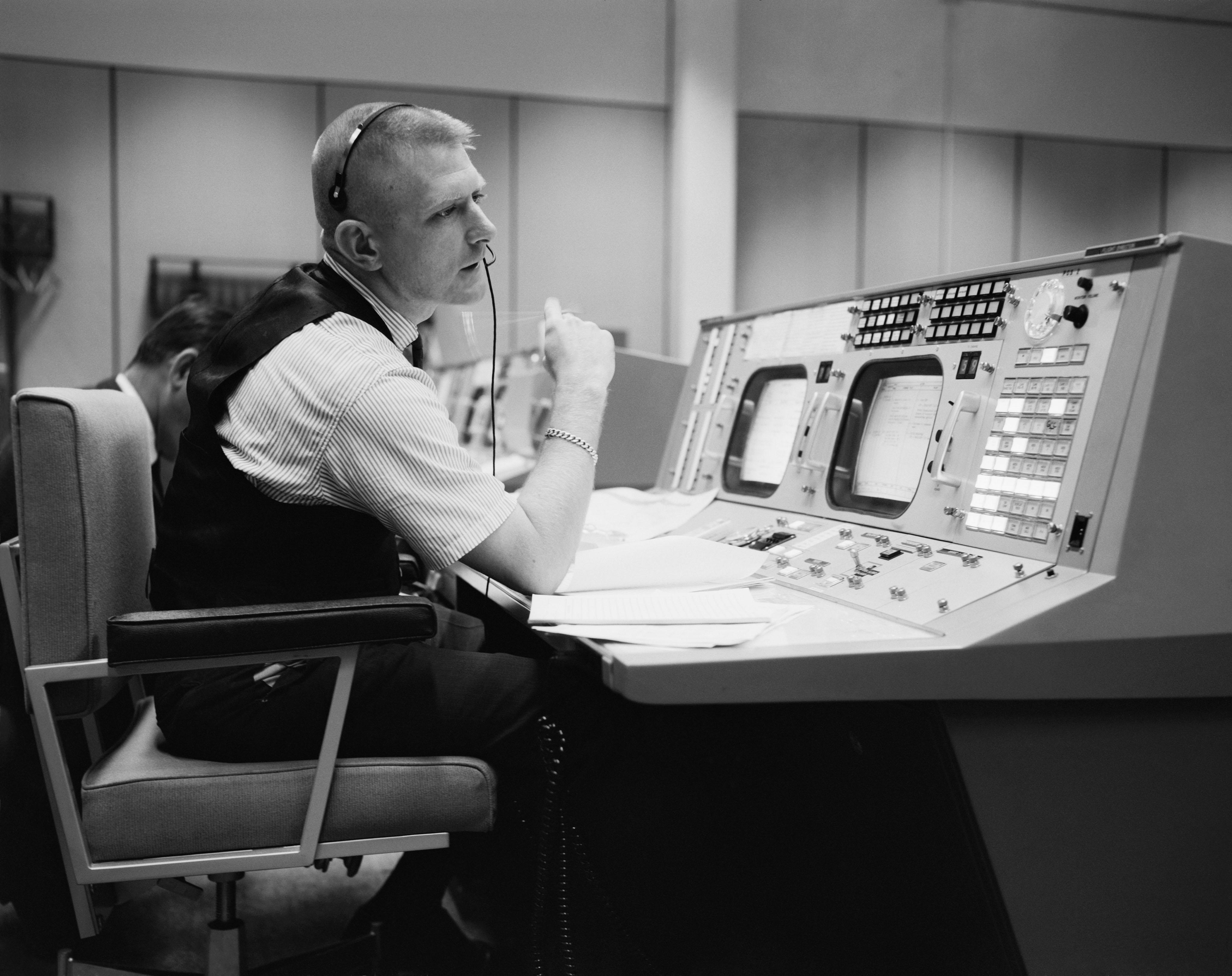
Kranz at his console on May 30, 1965, in the Mission Operations Control Room, Mission Control Center, Houston.

After completing the research tests at Holloman Air Force Base, Kranz left McDonnell Aircraft and joined the NASA Space Task Group, then at its Langley Research Center in Virginia. Upon joining NASA, he was assigned, by flight director Christopher C. Kraft, as a Mission Control procedures officer for the uncrewed Mercury-Redstone 1 (MR-1) test (dubbed in Kranz's autobiography as the "Four-Inch Flight", due to its failure to launch).

As Procedures Officer, Kranz was put in charge of integrating Mercury Control with the Launch Control Team at Cape Canaveral, Florida, writing the "Go/NoGo" procedures that allowed missions to continue as planned or be aborted, along with serving as a sort of switchboard operator between the control center at Cape Canaveral and the agency's fourteen tracking stations and two tracking ships via Teletype, located across the globe. Kranz performed this role for all crewed and uncrewed Mercury flights, including the MR-3 and MA-6 flights, which put the first Americans into space and orbit respectively.

After MA-6, he was promoted to Assistant Flight Director for the MA-7 flight of Scott Carpenter in May 1962. MA-7 was his first mission as assistant flight director (AFD); he was under Kraft (the flight director of MA-7). Kranz and Kraft were not the sole reason that MA-7 was saved, as that would be attributed to the whole efforts of Mission Control, but they played a major role.

Kranz continued in this role for the remaining two Mercury flights and the first three Gemini flights. With the upcoming Gemini flights, he was promoted to the Flight Director level and served his first shift, the so-called "operations shift", for the Gemini 4 mission in 1965, the first U.S. EVA and four-day flight. After Gemini, he served as a Flight Director on odd-numbered Apollo missions, including Apollos 1, 5, 7 and 9, and the first (and only) successful uncrewed test of the Lunar Module (Apollo 5). He was serving as Flight Director for Apollo 11 when the Lunar Module Eagle landed on the Moon on July 20, 1969.

Kranz was chosen to be one of the first flight directors to fly crewed Apollo missions. Kranz worked with the contractor, McDonnell-Douglas on the Mercury and Gemini project, but for Apollo there was a new contractor, Rockwell. Kranz describes Rockwell as new and unfamiliar with the space industry, as they were known for their aeronautical significance at the time. Kranz was assigned as a division chief for Apollo; his tasks included mission preparation, mission design, the writing of the procedures, and the development of the handbooks. Kranz explains that the Apollo program was different from other programs in that time was a major factor. Other missions were allotted ample amount of time; Apollo was not given this luxury. The book by NASA, What Made Apollo a Success?, has a section about flight control written by Kranz and James Otis Covington. It gives more detail of the Flight Control Division of the Apollo program.

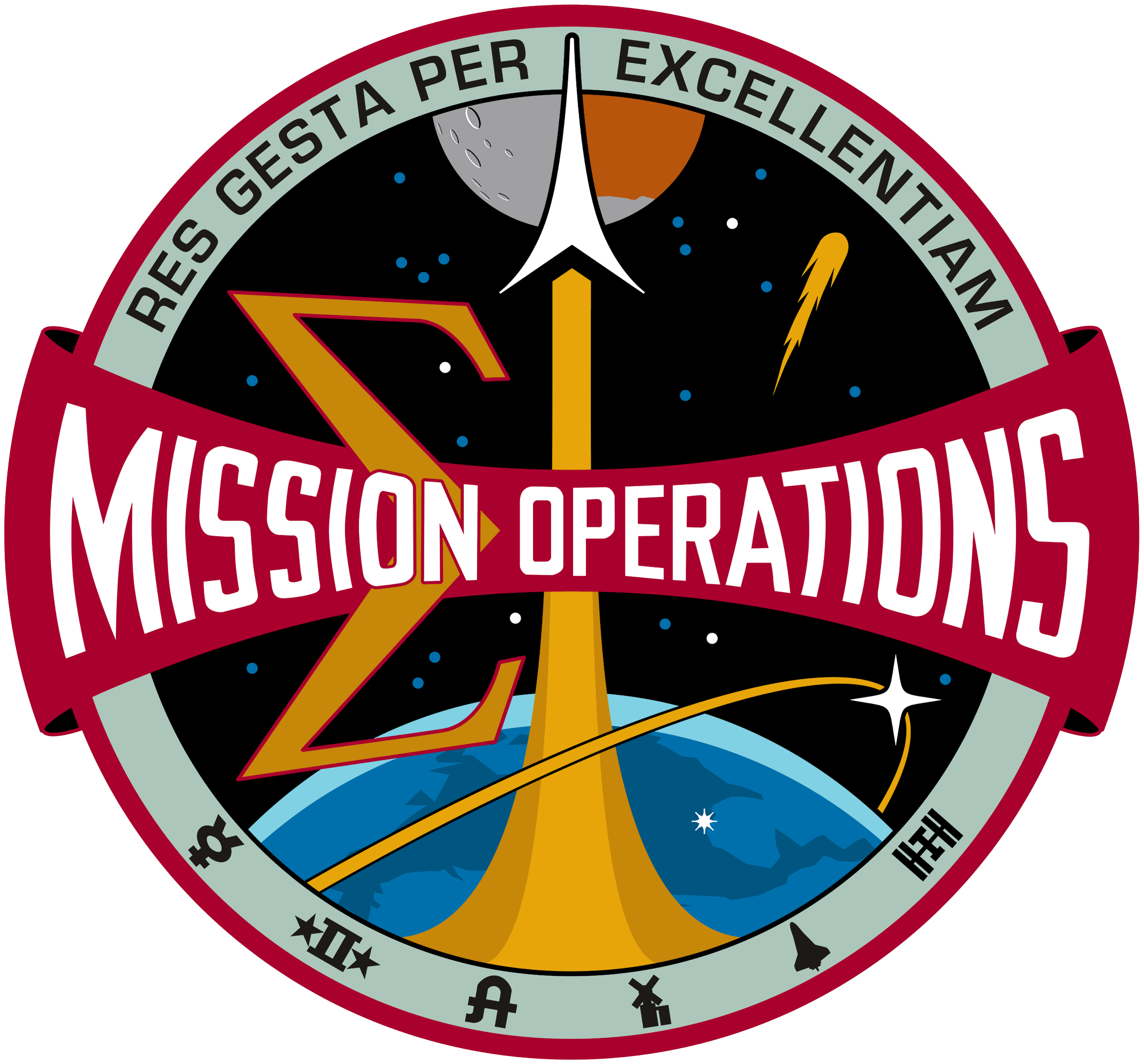
Mission Control logo. Res Gesta Per Excellentiam means Achieve through excellence.

Kranz explains that the Mission Control logo is an interesting one; he associates it with commitment, teamwork, discipline, morale, tough, competent, risk, and sacrifice.

=== Apollo 13 ===
Kranz is perhaps best known for his role as lead flight director (nicknamed "White Flight") during NASA's Apollo 13 crewed Moon landing mission. Kranz's team was on duty when part of the Apollo 13 Service Module exploded and they dealt with the initial hours of the unfolding accident. His "White Team", dubbed the "Tiger Team" by the press, set the constraints for the consumption of spacecraft consumables (oxygen, electricity, and water) and controlled the three course-correction burns during the trans-Earth trajectory, as well as the power-up procedures that allowed the astronauts to land safely back on Earth in the command module. He and his team were recommended by NASA Administrator Thomas O. Paine in communications with Richard Nixon to receive the Presidential Medal of Freedom for their roles.

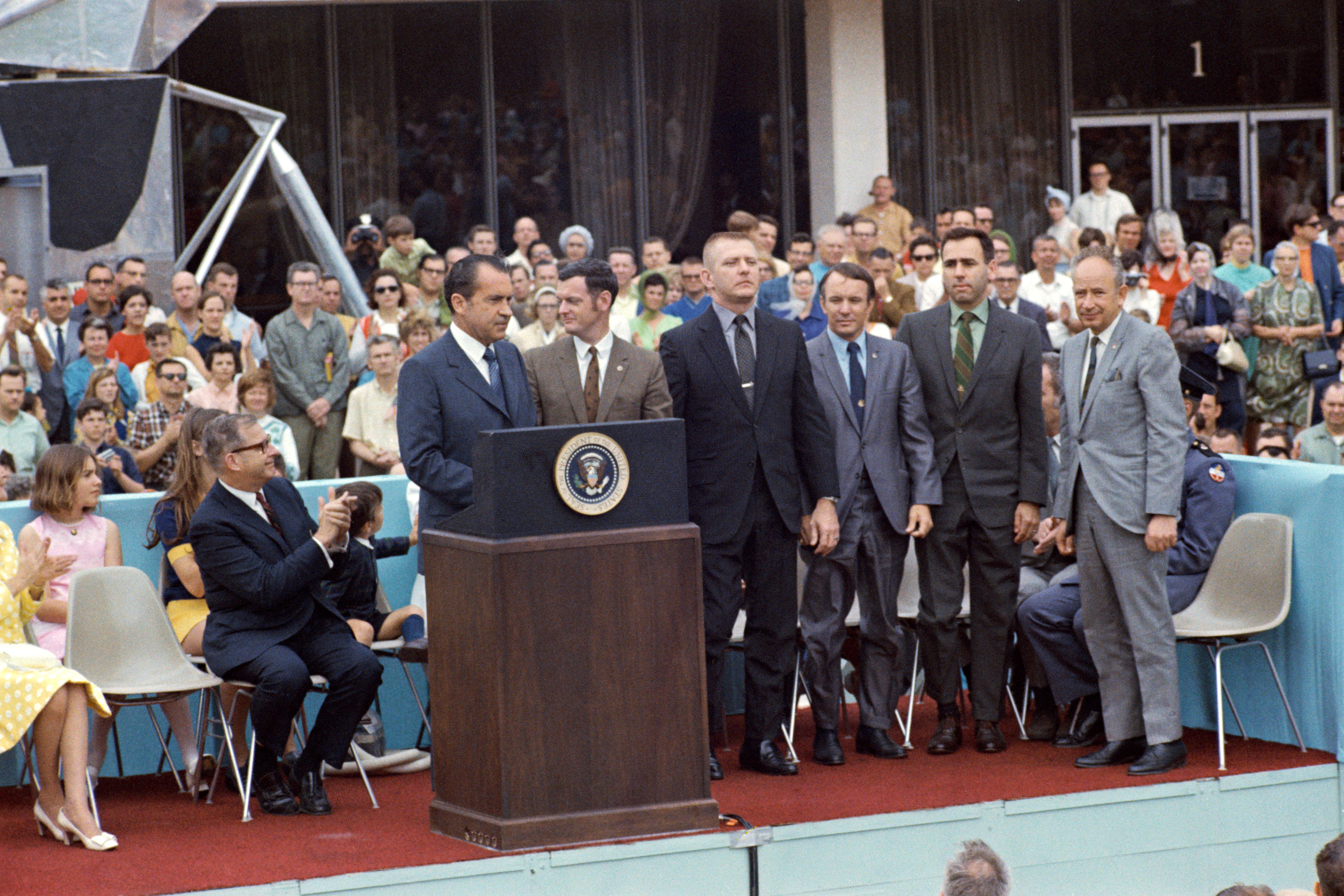
President Nixon visits the Johnson Space Center on April 18, 1970, to award the Presidential Medal of Freedom to the Apollo 13 Mission Operations Team

=== Later career ===
Kranz continued as a Flight Director through Apollo 15 and Apollo 17, when he worked his last shift as a flight director overseeing the mission liftoff. He then was promoted to Deputy Director of NASA Mission Operations in 1974, becoming Director in 1983. He was in Mission Control during the January 28, 1986, loss of Space Shuttle Challenger on the STS-51-L launch. He retired from NASA in 1994, after the successful STS-61 flight that repaired the optically flawed Hubble Space Telescope in 1993.

=== After retirement ===
In 2000, Kranz published his autobiography titled Failure Is Not An Option (ISBN 978-1-4391-4881-5), borrowing a line used in the 1995 Apollo 13 film by actor Ed Harris portraying Kranz. The History Channel later used it to adapt a documentary about Mission Control in 2004.

Starting in 2017, Kranz helped kickstart and direct the restoration of the Mission Control Room in the Johnson Space Center to the appearance and function of its 1969 use, during the Apollo 11 mission. The five million dollar project was intended to be completed for the 50th anniversary of the Apollo 11 mission. For his efforts, Kranz was recognized by Houston Mayor Sylvester Turner and October 23, 2018 was declared "Gene Kranz Day". During the 2018 "To the Moon and Beyond" luncheon hosted by Space Center Houston, The Gene Kranz Scholarship was started, geared towards funding young students to take part in activities and training for careers in STEM. The Ohio State Legislature introduced House Bill 358 to designate August 17 as "Gene Kranz Day" in the fall of 2019. In May 2020, the bill was passed by the Ohio House of Representatives and introduced in the Senate, where as of 2025 it remains at the committee stage.

Post-retirement, Kranz became a flight engineer on a restored Boeing B-17 Flying Fortress, flying at air shows throughout the United States for six years. Kranz continues to give motivational speeches and talks about his experiences with the space programs.

== Personal life ==
Kranz, a Catholic, has six children with his wife, Marta: Carmen (born 1958), Lucy (1959), Joan Frances (1961), Mark (1963), Brigid (1964), and Jean Marie (1966). In a NASA article, Lessons from My Father, Kranz's youngest daughter Jeannie mentioned that her dad was a very "engaged" father and likened him to the character Ward Cleaver in the television show Leave it to Beaver.

== Trivia ==
Kranz has appeared as a character in several dramatizations of the Apollo program. The first portrayal was in the 1974 TV movie Houston, We've Got a Problem, where he is played by Ed Nelson. He is played by Ed Harris in the 1995 film Apollo 13 and Matt Frewer portrays him in the 1996 TV movie Apollo 11. He is portrayed by Dan Butler in the 1998 HBO miniseries From the Earth to the Moon. In a 2016 episode of the NBC series Timeless titled "Space Race", he is portrayed by John Brotherton. In the 2019 Apple TV+ series For All Mankind he is played by Eric Ladin and given the alternate history context of the series, his character is depicted with elements that are partially fictional.

In the videogame Kerbal Space Program, the character for Mission Control is named "Gene Kerman", referencing Kranz and wearing a vest reminiscent of his signature apparel.

Kranz has also been featured in several documentaries using NASA film archives, including the 2004 History Channel production Failure Is Not an Option and its 2005 follow-up Beyond the Moon: Failure Is Not an Option 2, recurring History Channel broadcasts based on the 1979 book The Right Stuff, the 2008 Discovery Channel production When We Left Earth, and the 2017 David Fairhead documentary Mission Control: The Unsung Heroes of Apollo.

Archive audio clips including Kranz's name and voice are included in the track "Go!" on the 2015 Public Service Broadcasting album The Race for Space, a track inspired by the Apollo 11 Moon landing.

The Eugene Kranz Junior High School, located in Dickinson, Texas, is named after him.

In 2020, Toledo Express Airport was renamed officially to the Eugene F. Kranz Toledo Express Airport.

In 2025, Seiko launched the SRPL91 and SRPL93, nicknamed "Gene Kranz". These watches were a reissue of the original Seiko 5, which Gene wore during the famous Apollo 11 mission.

== "Failure is not an option" ==
Kranz has become associated with the phrase "failure is not an option” from the 1995 film dramatization Apollo 13. Kranz then used it as the title of his 2000 autobiography. Later it became the title of a 2004 television documentary about NASA, as well as of that documentary's sequel, Beyond the Moon: Failure Is Not an Option 2. Kranz travels all over the world giving a motivational lecture titled "Failure Is Not an Option", including the historic Apollo 13 flight control room.

"Failure is not an option" was in fact coined by Bill Broyles, one of the screenwriters of Apollo 13, based on a similar statement made not by Kranz, but another member of the Apollo 13 mission control crew, FDO Flight Controller Jerry Bostick. According to Bostick:

As far as the expression 'Failure is not an option,' you are correct that Kranz never used that term. In preparation for the movie, the script writers, Al Reinart and Bill Broyles, came down to Clear Lake to interview me on "What are the people in Mission Control really like?" One of their questions was "Weren't there times when everybody, or at least a few people, just panicked?" My answer was "No, when bad things happened, we just calmly laid out all the options, and failure was not one of them. We never panicked, and we never gave up on finding a solution." I immediately sensed that Bill Broyles wanted to leave and assumed that he was bored with the interview. Only months later did I learn that when they got in their car to leave, he started screaming, "That's it! That's the tag line for the whole movie, Failure is not an option. Now we just have to figure out who to have say it." Of course, they gave it to the Kranz character, and the rest is history.

== Teams, "the human factor" and "the right stuff" ==
Each Flight Director took a different color as a designator; the first three Flight Directors chose red, white, and blue, and each was identified as "_____ Flight" (a tradition that continues to this day). Thus, Kranz was White Flight and was the leader of the "White Team", one of the flight control teams whose shift at Mission Control contributed to saving the Apollo 13 astronauts. Though Apollo 13 did not achieve its main objective, to Kranz its astronauts' rescue is an example of the "human factor" born out of the 1960s space race. According to Kranz, this factor is what is largely responsible for helping put the United States on the Moon in only a decade. The blend of young intelligent minds working day in and day out by sheer willpower yielded "the right stuff".

Kranz had this to say about the "human factor":

They were people who were energized by a mission. And these teams were capable of moving right on and doing anything America asked them to do in space.

According to him, a few organized examples of this factor included Grumman, who developed the Apollo Lunar Module, North American Aviation, and the Lockheed Corporation. After the excitement of the 1960s, these companies dissolved in corporate mergers, such as happened when Lockheed became Lockheed Martin. Another example of the "human factor" was the ingenuity and hard work by teams that developed the emergency plans and sequences as new problems arose during the Apollo 13 mission.

== "The Kranz Dictum" ==
Kranz called a meeting of his branch and flight control team on the Monday morning following the Apollo 1 disaster that killed Gus Grissom, Ed White, and Roger Chaffee. Kranz made the following address to the gathering (The Kranz Dictum), in which his expression of values and admonishments for future spaceflight are his legacy to NASA:

Spaceflight will never tolerate carelessness, incapacity, and neglect. Somewhere, somehow, we screwed up. It could have been in design, build, or test. Whatever it was, we should have caught it. We were too gung ho about the schedule and we locked out all of the problems we saw each day in our work. Every element of the program was in trouble and so were we. The simulators were not working, Mission Control was behind in virtually every area, and the flight and test procedures changed daily. Nothing we did had any shelf life. Not one of us stood up and said, "Dammit, stop!" I don't know what Thompson's committee will find as the cause, but I know what I find. We are the cause! We were not ready! We did not do our job. We were rolling the dice, hoping that things would come together by launch day, when in our hearts we knew it would take a miracle. We were pushing the schedule and betting that the Cape would slip before we did.

From this day forward, Flight Control will be known by two words: "Tough" and "Competent". Tough means we are forever accountable for what we do or what we fail to do. We will never again compromise our responsibilities. Every time we walk into Mission Control we will know what we stand for. Competent means we will never take anything for granted. We will never be found short in our knowledge and in our skills. Mission Control will be perfect. When you leave this meeting today you will go to your office and the first thing you will do there is to write "Tough and Competent" on your blackboards. It will never be erased. Each day when you enter the room these words will remind you of the price paid by Grissom, White, and Chaffee. These words are the price of admission to the ranks of Mission Control.

After the Space Shuttle Columbia accident in 2003, NASA Administrator Sean O'Keefe quoted this speech in a discussion about what changes should be made in response to the disaster. Referring to the words "tough and competent", he said, "These words are the price of admission to the ranks of NASA and we should adopt it that way."

== Views on the space program after the Moon landing ==
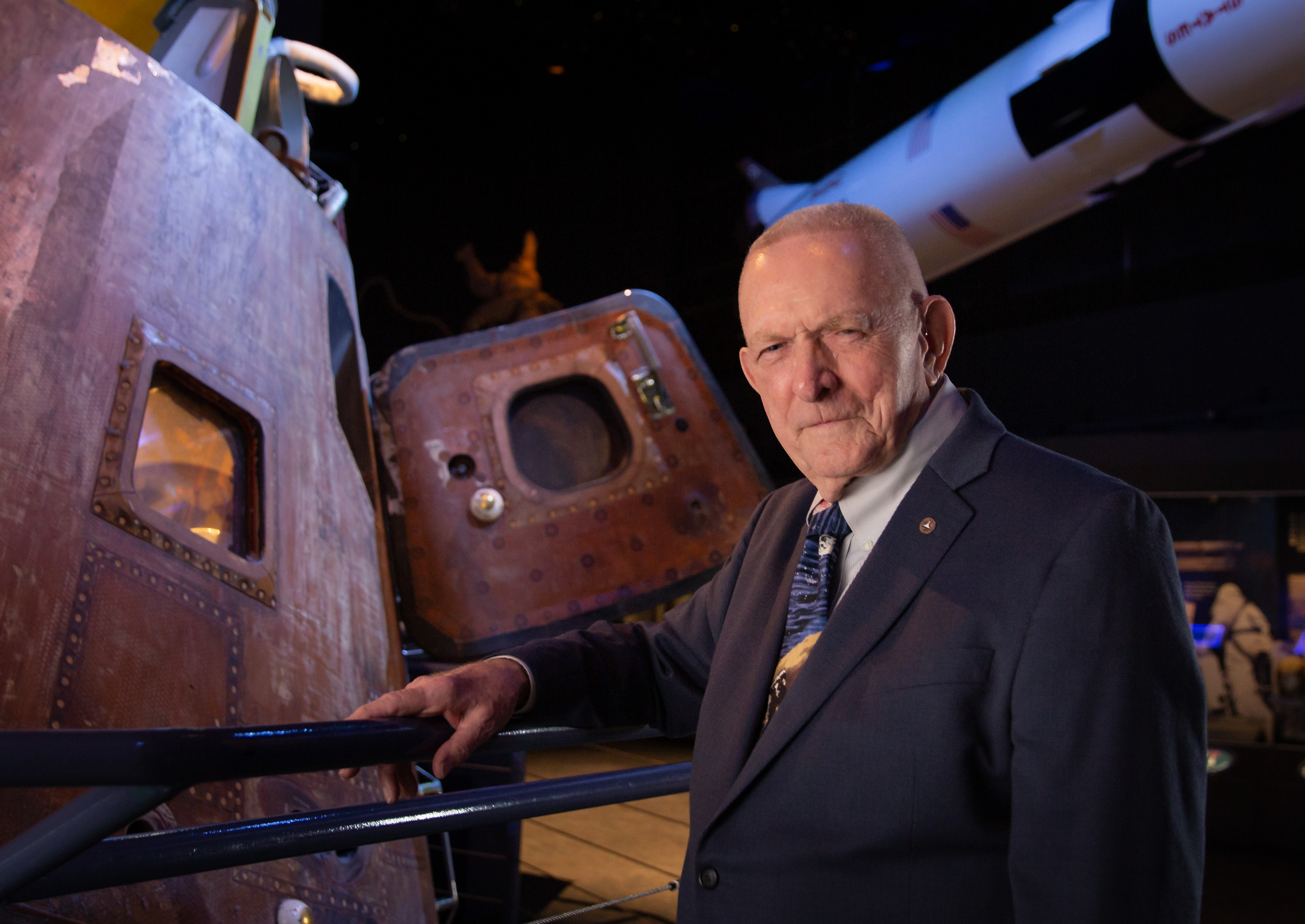
Kranz in July 2019, while attending events at Space Center Houston

Kranz said that much of the "human factor" dried up after the Moon landings, particularly because the United States viewed the Moon landings as a short-term goal to beat the Soviet Union – and not much more. When asked in spring 2000 if NASA is still the same place today as it was in the years of the space race, he replied:

No. In many ways we have the young people, we have the talent, we have the imagination, we have the technology. But I don't believe we have the leadership and the willingness to accept risk, to achieve great goals. I believe we need a long-term national commitment to explore the universe. And I believe this is an essential investment in the future of our nation – and our beautiful, but environmentally challenged planet.

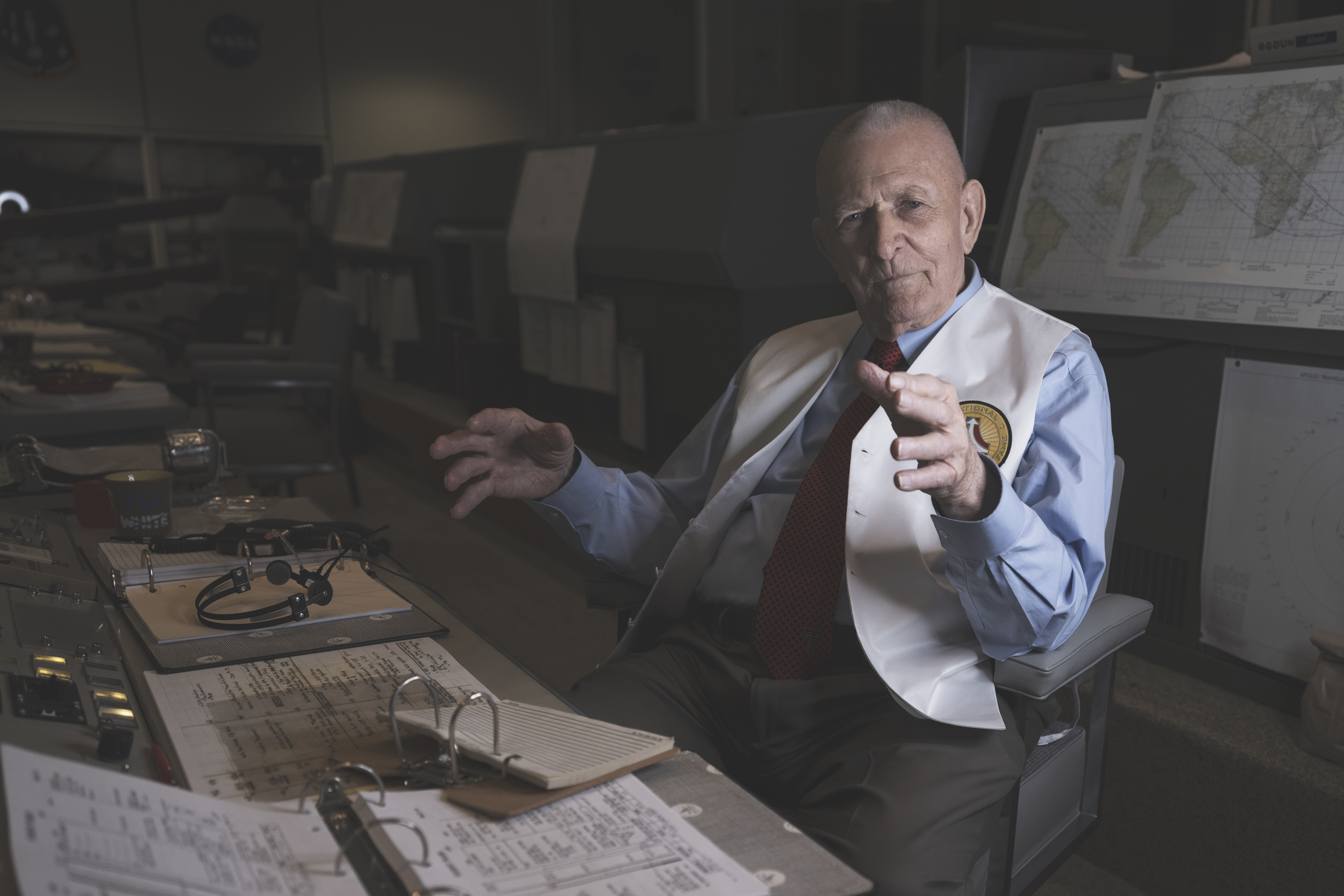
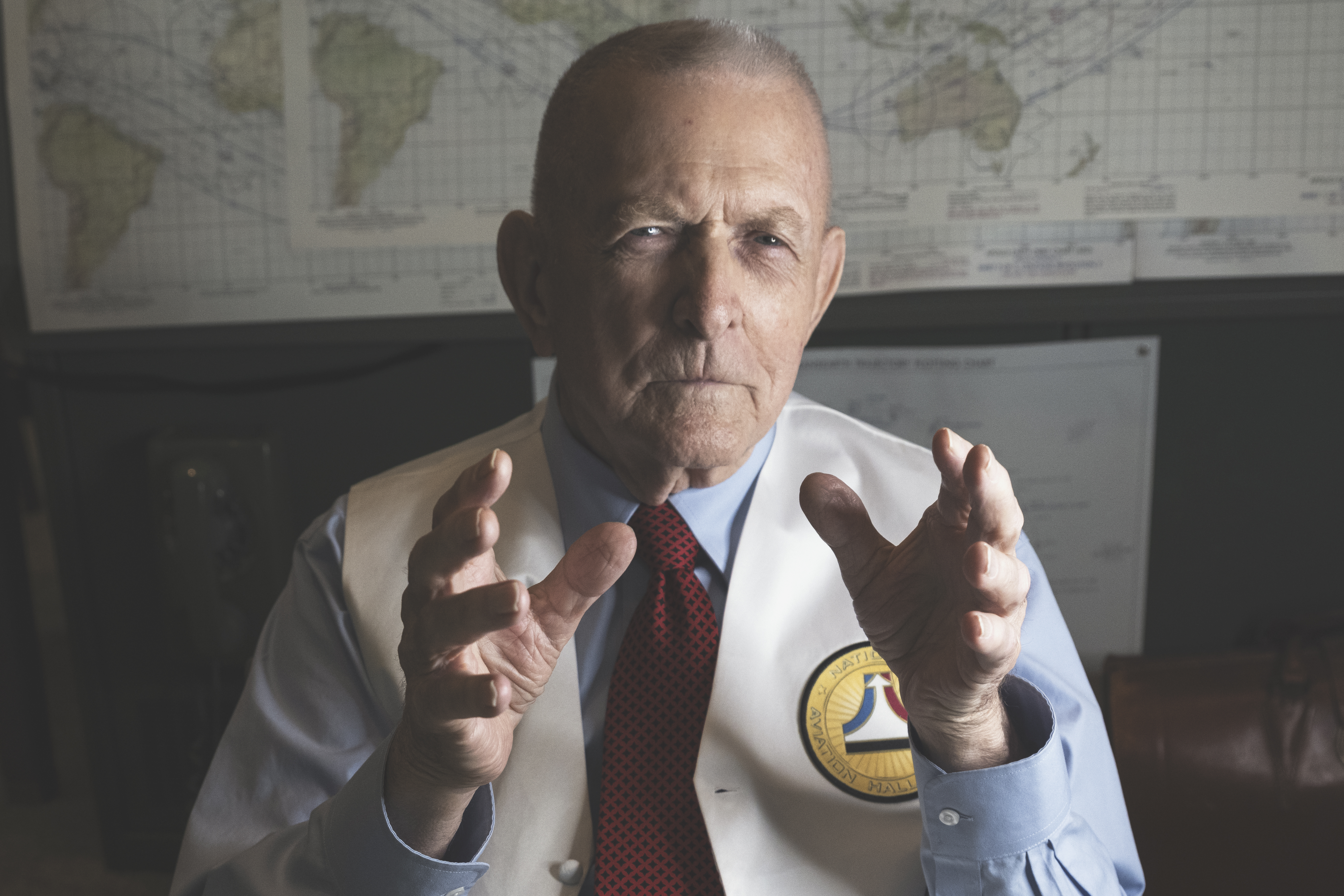
Gene Kranz at Johnson Space Center in 2022

In his book Failure Is Not an Option, he also expressed disappointment that support for space exploration dried up after the Apollo program. Writing about his vision for renewing the space program he said:

Revitalize NASA. Lacking a clear goal the team that placed an American on the Moon, NASA, has become just another federal bureaucracy beset by competing agendas and unable to establish discipline within its structure. Although NASA has an amazing array of technology and the most talented workforce in history, it lacks top-level vision. It began its retreat from the inherent risks of space exploration after the Challenger accident. During the last decade its retreat has turned into a rout. The NASA Administrator is appointed by the President and to a great degree represents the current President's views on space. If space is put on the national agenda for the coming national election [2000], a newly elected President will have the opportunity to select new top-level NASA leadership that is committed and willing to take the steps to rebuild the space agency and get America's space program moving again.

== Honors ==
- American Institute of Aeronautics and Astronautics: Lawrence Sperry Award, 1967
- Saint Louis University: Alumni Merit Award, 1968; Founders Award, 1993; Honorary Doctor of Science, 2015
- NASA Exceptional Service Medal, 1969 and 1970
- Presidential Medal of Freedom, 1970
- Downtown Jaycees of Washington D.C. Arthur S. Fleming Award – one of ten outstanding young men in government service in 1970
- NASA Distinguished Service Medal, 1970, 1982, and 1988
- NASA Outstanding Leadership Medal, 1973 and 1993
- NASA SES Meritorious Executive, 1980, 1985 and 1992
- American Astronautical Society: AAS Fellow, 1982; Spaceflight Award, 1987
- Robert R. Gilruth Award, 1988, North Galveston County Jaycees
- The National Space Club; Astronautics Engineer of the Year Award, 1992
- Theodore Von Karman Lectureship, 1994
- Recipient of the 1995 History of Aviation Award for the "Safe return of the Apollo 13 Crew", Hawthorne, California
- Honorary Doctor of Engineering Degree from the Milwaukee School of Engineering, 1996
- Louis Bauer Lecturer, Aerospace Medical Association, 2000
- Selected for "2004 and 2006 Gathering of Eagles" honoring Aerospace and Aviation Pioneers at the Air Force Air Command and Staff College, Maxwell AFB, Alabama
- John Glenn Lecture, Smithsonian National Air and Space Museum, 2005
- Lloyd Nolen, Lifetime Achievement in Aviation Award, 2005
- Wright Brothers Lecture – Wright Patterson AFB, 2006
- NASA Ambassador of Exploration, 2006
- Rotary National Award for Space Achievement's National Space Trophy, 2007
- Air Force ROTC Distinguished Alumni Award, 2014
- National Aviation Hall of Fame, 2015
- Honorary Doctorate of Science from Saint Louis University, 2015
- Great American Award, The All-American Boys Chorus, 2015
- Daughters of the American Revolution (DAR) Medal of Honor, 2017
- Vice Admiral Donald D. Engen, U.S. Navy (Ret.), Flight Jacket Night Lecture, Smithsonian National Air and Space Museum – National Air and Space Society, November 8, 2018
- Eugene F. Kranz Toledo Express Airport was renamed in honor of Kranz in 2020
- Awarded the 2021 Michael Collins Trophy for Lifetime Achievement from the Smithsonian National Air and Space Museum
- American Astronautical Society (AAS) presented Gene Kranz with the AAS Lifetime Achievement Award on May 15, 2025, at Space Center Houston - Visitor Center for the NASA Johnson Space Center

== Sources ==
- Failure Is Not an Option: Mission Control from Mercury to Apollo 13 and Beyond Gene Kranz, Simon and Schuster, 2000, ISBN 978-0-7432-0079-0
- Lost Moon by James Lovell (ISBN 0-671-53464-5)
- The Last Man on the Moon: Astronaut Eugene Cernan and America's Race in Space by Gene Cernan (ISBN 0-312-19906-6)
- Thirteen: The Apollo Flight That Failed by Henry S. F. Cooper Jr. (ISBN 0-8018-5097-5)
